= HMAS Lolita =

Australian ship in World War II

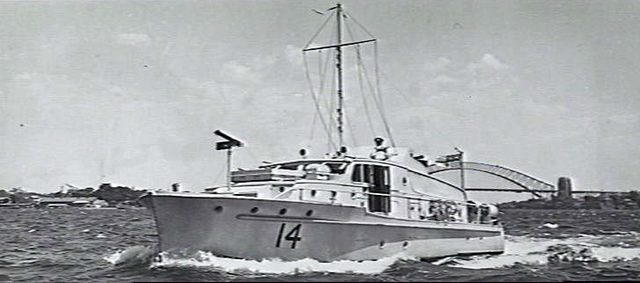
Port bow view of the channel patrol vessel HMAS Lolita (14).

HMAS Lolita (14) was formerly a luxury motor cruiser, commissioned as a channel patrol boat into and operated by the Royal Australian Navy (RAN) during World War II. She was one of thirteen similar vessels, known to Sydney siders as the 'Hollywood Fleet'.

She was built by W L Holmes of Neutral Bay and was launched in 1936 as Lolita II for Arthur Douglas Walker, a businessman and former Mayor of Mosman. When Walker sold his first Lolita (renamed Urallia), Lolita II became Lolita. By March 1940, Lolita was owned by H C Small, the proprietor of Small's Chocolates.

She was requisitioned and taken over by the Navy on 26 September 1941, commissioned by the RAN on 22 November 1941 under the command of Commissioned Warrant Officer Herbert S Anderson RANR(S). Lolita was returned to W L Homes shipyard for a naval refit - gone were the luxuries, painted navy grey and armed with .303 Vickers machine guns fore and aft and depth charge racks on the stern. She was finally purchased from Small on 18 May 1942, ten days after the Battle of the Coral Sea for 3,000 pounds. Following her requisition, HMAS Lolita carried out patrol duties at Port Kembla, Newcastle, Broken Bay and Sydney.

During the Battle of Sydney Harbour (often referred to as the attack on Sydney Harbour) by the Imperial Japanese Navy on 31 May and 1 June 1942, Anderson in command of HMAS Lolita then at the eastern end of the boom net, was called by the commander of HMAS Yarroma at the western end of the boom net, to investigate an object inside the western end of the anti-submarine boom net. Having identified the object to be an enemy submarine, Anderson notified the Port War Signal Station that he had sighted the submarine and was attacking. Given the submarine was located between the boom net and the Western Pile Light, Anderson was unable to make a passing run to drop Lolita's depth charges. He therefore motored Lolita stern first to the submarine where he rolled a depth charge off the stern and sped away to avoid the explosion. However, there was no explosion. Realising the water was too shallow, members of the crew attached floats to the second depth charge to slow its rate of descent so as to trigger the fuse. Having done so, Anderson again manoeuvred Lolita stern first to the submarine and rolled the second depth charge into the water. Again there was no explosion. As they approached to drop the third depth charge, the submarine exploded showering debris over Lolita and picking her up on the wave from the explosion. Subsequent investigations confirmed the crew of the submarine had triggered a self-destruct charge which severed the bow of the submarine killing both crew members. Members of Lolita's crew were satisfied that as they approached to drop the third depth charge, the crew of the submarine knew they had been spotted and as the 'game was up', they destroyed their submarine in an attempt to also destroy Lolita. Following the destruction of the submarine, Lolita resumed patrols.

Despite Lolita's action during the Battle of Sydney Harbour causing the destruction of the enemy submarine at the boom net, HMAS Lolita, Anderson and his crew were not mentioned in Rear Admiral Muirhead-Gould's report of the Battle. Whilst a 'Pacific 1942' Battle Honour was awarded to her sister ships HMAS Seamist, HMAS Steady Hour and HMAS Yarroma for their roles in the Battle of Sydney Harbour, no such Battle Honour was awarded to Lolita. In or about 2004, Anderson's son sought to have his father's actions recognised. In the Defence Honours and Awards Appeals Tribunal, author Steven Carruthers gave evidence that Anderson had put Lolita 'in the line of fire to do his duty' and that had Anderson not taken the action resulting in the explosion that wrecked the submarine, 'far more damage could have been caused that night' by attacks from the remaining two submarines. Finally in 2013, the Defence Honours and Awards Appeals Tribunal decided not to recommend a defence honour for Anderson, but recognised 'Anderson put himself and Lolita in danger when he attacked the submarine and his actions possibly led to Midget 14 destroying itself' and 'CWO Anderson played an important role in the defence of Sydney Harbour'. In support of not recommending Anderson for an Award, the Tribunal cited 'certain procedures' had not been followed and in any event, 'retrospective recognition' was not possible. Recent Inquires regarding an appropriate award for Ordinary Seaman Edward 'Teddy' Sheean aboard HMAS Armidale, identified those reasons constituted maladministration. As a consequence, it was identified the decision of the Tribunal should be set aside, and the responsible Minister should issue instructions for there to be a new Inquiry. On two occasions in 2020 and 2021, Defence Department staff have refused to support the Minister to do so. A full account of the Tribunal's inquires can be found in 'Lolita and the Hollywood Fleet' (see below).

Following the Battle of Sydney Harbour (often referred to as the attack on Sydney Harbour), HMAS Lolita continued patrol duties at Sydney and Newcastle. In August 1944, Lolita received orders to proceed to New Guinea. Following the installation of new engines and fuel tanks to extend her range, Lolita proceeded north under tow by HMAS Yandra. Lolita finally arrived at Madang on 9 April 1945, with the intention to proceed further north to Wewak. Before doing so, she attended the repair base at Alexishafen for engine repairs and hull cleaning. However, on 13 June 1945, Lolita was destroyed at the repair base by a massive explosion within the engine room. The explosion caused the death of two naval personnel, William Bertalli and Alfred Smith and badly injured the commander Lieutenant Trim and another member of the crew.

In June 2020, HMAS Lolita was included within the Royal Australian Navy's memorial at Bradleys Head, Sydney, which recognises Australian naval vessels lost with loss of life.
