= HMAS Steady Hour =

Patrol boat of Royal Australian Navy

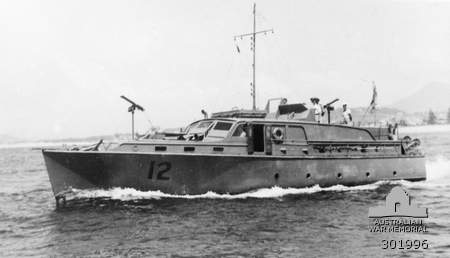
- HMAS Steady Hour at Port Kembla in 1944

History

Australia
- Name: Steady Hour
- Owner: Fred Harris
- Builder: Lars Halvorsen Sons, Neutral Bay

History

Australia
- Honours and awards: Battle honours: Pacific 1942
- Fate: Destroyed by fire in 1945

General characteristics
- Length: 56 feet (17 m)
- Armament: 2 .303 Vickers MG, 4 Depth charges

HMAS Steady Hour (12) was formerly a luxury motor cruiser, commissioned as a channel patrol boat and operated by the Royal Australian Navy (RAN) during World War II. She was one of thirteen similar vessels, known to Sydney siders as the 'Hollywood Fleet'.

Steady Hour was built by Lars Halvorsen Sons in 1940 for Fred Harris. This was the third vessel of the same name built for Harris. At 56 feet (17.07m), she was one of the smaller vessels in the fleet, similar in size to HMAS Lolita.

She was requisitioned and later commissioned by the RAN on 26 August 1941 under the command of Lieutenant Athol Townley. Steady Hour was armed with .303 Vickers machine guns fore and aft and depth charge racks on the stern.

During the Battle of Sydney Harbour (often referred to as the attack on Sydney Harbour) on 31 May and 1 June 1942, Steady Hour, having received orders at 3:10 am, got underway from her mooring in Farm Cove and proceeded to patrol the harbour towards the boom net. At approx. 5:00 am, her sister ship HMAS Seamist attacked midget submarine M-21 in Taylors Bay. After a delay, Steady Hour proceeded to the scene and conducted further searches. At approx. 6:40 am, a 'contact' was obtained by another sister ship, HMAS Yarroma, on which Steady Hour proceeded to drop depth charges. The submarine was later salvaged. Whilst credit for its destruction was given to Steady Hour and Yarroma, it is now accepted the submarine had been destroyed by the earlier attack of HMAS Seamist - if Seamist's attack had not been successful, M-21 would not have remained in Taylors Bay and found later by Yarroma.

For her role during the Battle of Sydney Harbour, Steady Hour was awarded the Battle Honour "Pacific 1942".

Following the Battle, it appears Steady Hour spent a considerable period of time in Sydney, before relocating to Port Kembla in November 1943. In April 1944, she was refitted in Sydney, (458) and arrived in Darwin via Thursday Island and Melville Bay on 22 May 1944 in company with HMAS Seamist. On 26 February 1945, she departed Darwin with Seamist and Alma Doepel for Thursday Island and further south for refit. On 3 March 1945 whilst refueling at Melville Bay, 650km east of Darwin, Steady Hour was destroyed by fire whilst refueling.

The commanding officer of Steady Hour, John Sykes was badly burnt, and together with the engineer and telegraphist, were taken to hospital. The subsequent Board of Inquiry recorded their appreciation of the action taken by Percy Allan, a sailor from Seamist who despite being unable to swim, dived into the shark infested waters to rescue Leading Seaman Piper. Piper had been blown overboard from Steady Hour. The NOIC of Darwin subsequently recommended to the Naval Board, that Allan be recognised by the Royal Humane Society for his actions. It is unknown if he was so recognised.
