= HMAS Silver Cloud =

History

Australia
- Name: Silver Cloud
- Builder: Lars Halvorsen Sons
- Completed: 1939
- Fate: Still in use as a private vessel

History

Australia
- Name: Silver Cloud

HMAS Silver Cloud (52) was a luxury motor cruiser, commissioned as a channel patrol boat operated by the Royal Australian Navy (RAN) during World War II. She was one of thirteen similar vessels, known to Sydneysiders as the 'Hollywood Fleet'.

Silver Cloud was a 65 ft cruiser built in 1939 by Lars Halvorsen Sons. At the time she was launched, she was the third Silver Cloud built for Jack Bruce, cousin of Stanley M Bruce, former Prime Minister and later Australia's High Commissioner to the United Kingdom. She was 58 feet 6 inches (17.83 m) with a beam of 14 feet 9 inches (4.50 m) powered by twin eight cylinder 180 hp Gray Marine engines. She included a two berth cabin, a single berth cabin, a crews cabin, galley with gas stove and electric refrigerator, shower room, toilet, dining saloon and a deck saloon. Keel and frames were of spotted gum, New Zealand kauri planking and Queensland maple superstructure and interior woodwork.

She was requisitioned and later commissioned by the RAN on 21 July 1941 under the command of Lieutenant R E Breydon, RANR. She was armed with Vickers machine guns fore and aft and depth charge racks on the stern.

During the Battle of Sydney Harbour (often referred to as the attack on Sydney Harbour), on 31 May and 1 June 1942, Silver Cloud remained moored to the wharf in Rushcutters Bay.

Whilst the RAN Sea Power Centre histories record her being employed on patrol duties of the swept channels to seaward of Sydney, and on patrol duties on the NSW coast, there is no record in the Sydney Log of Silver Cloud leaving Sydney after the Battle of Sydney Harbour. In 1978 when discussing the Battle of Sydney Harbour, Reg Andrew (former commander of HMAS Seamist) said Silver Cloud rarely ‘ever’ went on patrol as she was for ‘base duties and VIP cruises’.

On 12 July 1943 whilst getting underway at Hunters Bay, Sydney Harbour, Silver Cloud was consumed by fire. She was towed to the nearby wharf at HMAS Penguin where the local fire brigade was able to extinguish the fire, however the fire destroyed a large portion of the vessel to the waterline. A proposal was considered by the RAN for her to be re-built as a stores vessels, however, this was rejected and the remaining hull was sold to Lars Halvorsen and Sons.

Halvorsens subsequently re-built her. She remains afloat (May 2020) and in use.
