= Sydney Harbour anti-submarine boom net =

World War II naval defence net

Coordinates: 33.841076°S 151.276744°E

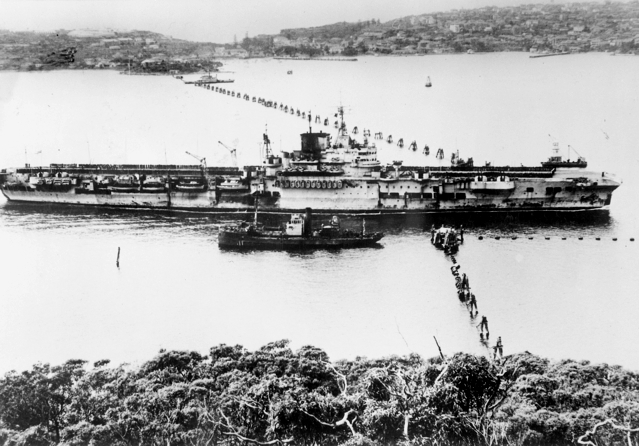
The British aircraft carrier HMS Formidable passing through the anti-submarine boom in Port Jackson (Sydney Harbour) in 1945

The Sydney Harbour anti-submarine boom net was an anti-torpedo and anti-submarine net that was installed in Sydney Harbour during World War II. It spanned the entire width of the harbour from Laing Point (formerly known as Green Point) in Watsons Bay to Georges Head Battery, on the Lower North Shore. The boom formed part of the broader Sydney Harbour coastal defences, which also included artillery batteries and patrol boats.

== History ==
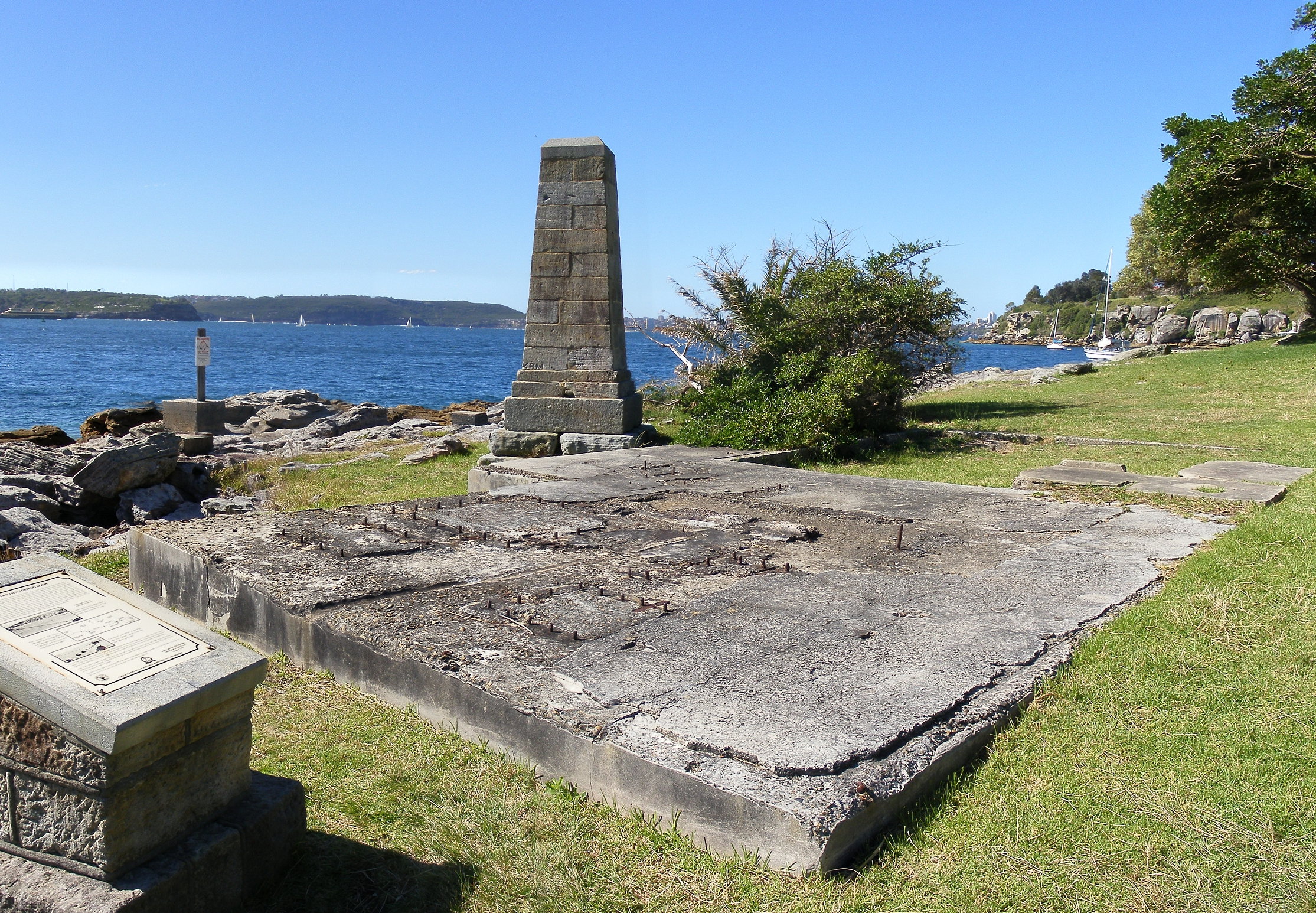
The foundations of the anti-submarine net winch house

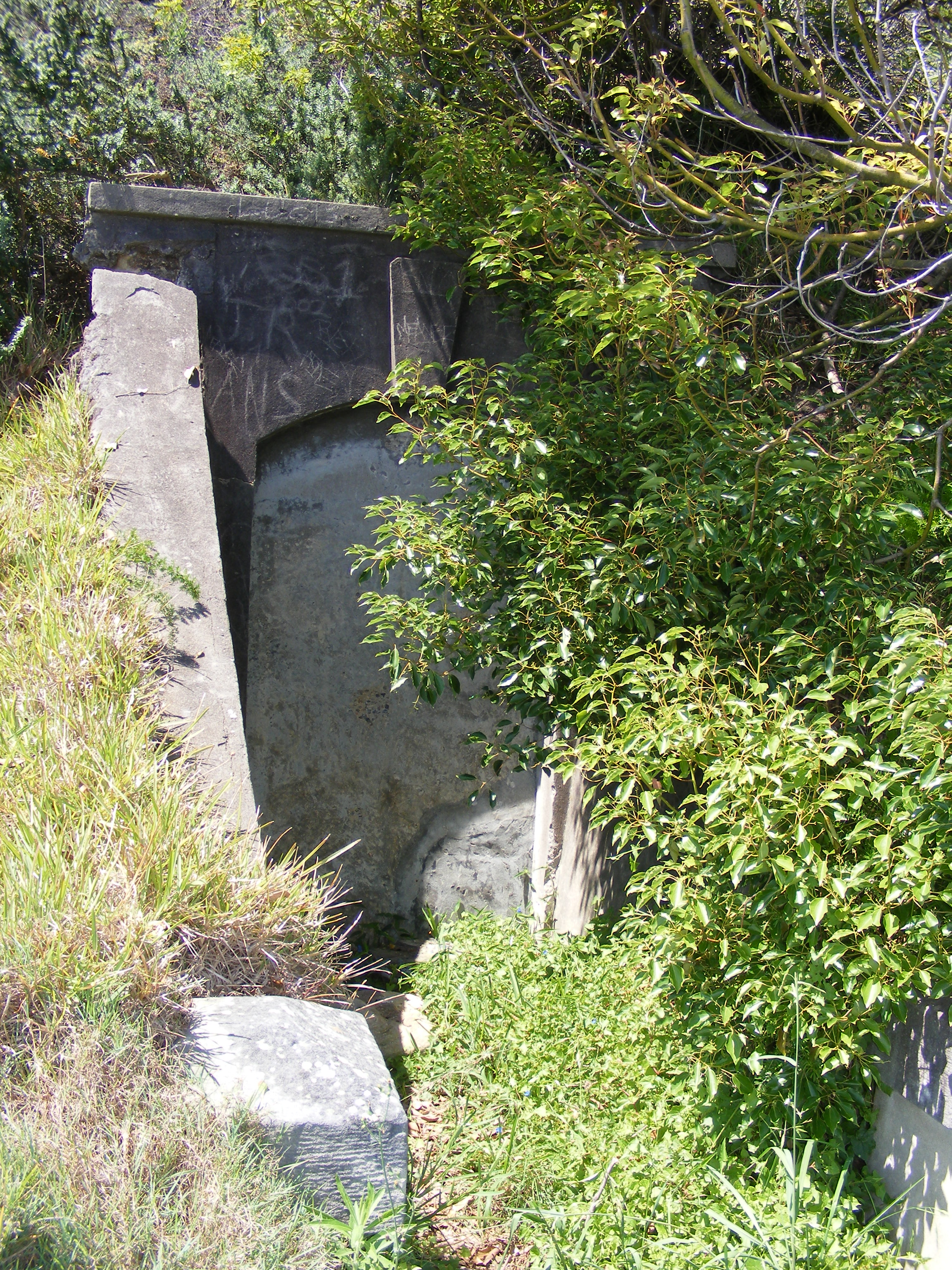
Entrance to Green Point Anti-motor torpedo boat defensive Battery.

Construction of the boom commenced in January 1942 and the boom and gates were fully operational by August 1942. For over three years, entry to Sydney Harbour was restricted by the boom net. All vessels including ships, ferries and fishing boats gained access to the harbour via one of three gates in the anti-torpedo and anti–submarine boom which spanned the harbour from Green Point to Georges Head.

On the night of 31 May 1942, three Japanese midget submarines entered the harbour in what became known as the Battle of Sydney Harbour (often referred to as the attack on Sydney Harbour). On the night of the attack the central section of the net was complete and support piles were in place to the west, but there were gaps of up to 400 metres (1,300 ft) wide on either side of the boom net. Material shortages, not lack of interest, prevented the completion of the boom net prior to the attack. The first submarine, the M-14, commanded by Lieutenant Jahai Chuma, was the first submarine to attempt entry. After passing through the western gap, M-14 became entangled in the western end of the boom net's central section. Lieutenant Chuma tried to free his submarine, however, his actions entangled its twin propellers further. At approx. 8.30 pm the night watchman James Cargill, aboard the Maritime Service Board construction barge, spotted what he thought to be a fishing boat at the net and rowed across in a boat. He discovered the object to be the bow of the Japanese submarine. Surprised, Cargill reported the discovery to the nearby channel patrol boat, HMAS Yarroma. The commander of Yarroma reported the object and received instructions to investigate further. Suspecting the object maybe a mine, and being reluctant to approach, he called HMAS Lolita from the eastern end of the boom net. HMAS Lolita came across the harbour and approached the object. Those aboard Lolita confirmed the object to be a midget submarine. Realising the consequences if the submarine broke free and proceeded up the harbour, the commander of Lolita, Commissioned Warrant Officer Herbert Anderson signalled naval headquarters a submarine had been identified and he was proceeding to attack. Given the location of M-14 and the adjacent Western Pile Light, he was unable to make a passing run and proceeded stern first to the submarine where he dropped a depth charge. Unfortunately the depth charges had been ordered to be set to 100 feet and due to the shallow water it failed to detonate. He again manoeuvred to the submarine and dropped a second depth charge which also failed to explode. As he manoeuvred Lolita to drop a third depth charge, at approx. 10:27 pm, Chuma, realising that he had been detected, detonated self-destruct charges, destroying the submarine and killing himself and his crew member. The two other midget submarines, M-21 and M-24 successfully penetrated the partially completed boom net. M-24 fired two torpedoes at USS Chicago. Both missed with one detonating against the Garden Island sea wall destroying HMAS Kuttabul. The second ran harmlessly onto the shore at Garden Island. M-24 then escaped the harbour and was discovered in 2006 on the sea bed off Sydney's northern beaches. M-21 was sighted in Taylors Bay and subsequently destroyed by depth charges from HMAS Seamist (incorrectly referred to as HMAS Sea Mist).

The boom net was removed after the end of the war in August 1945, and by early 1946, everything apart from the dolphins had been removed. The foundations of the winch house are the only remaining evidence of the anti-submarine boom net and they can still be seen on the shores of Green Point, along with other remaining evidence of military installations, such as underground fortifications and bunker complexes.

Adjacent to the winch house stood a stone marker that had existed for 90 years prior to the boom net's construction. Erected in 1850, this was used as a navigational leading mark for the Eastern Channel; it was lined up with the back mark which still stands on the west side of Parsley Bay.

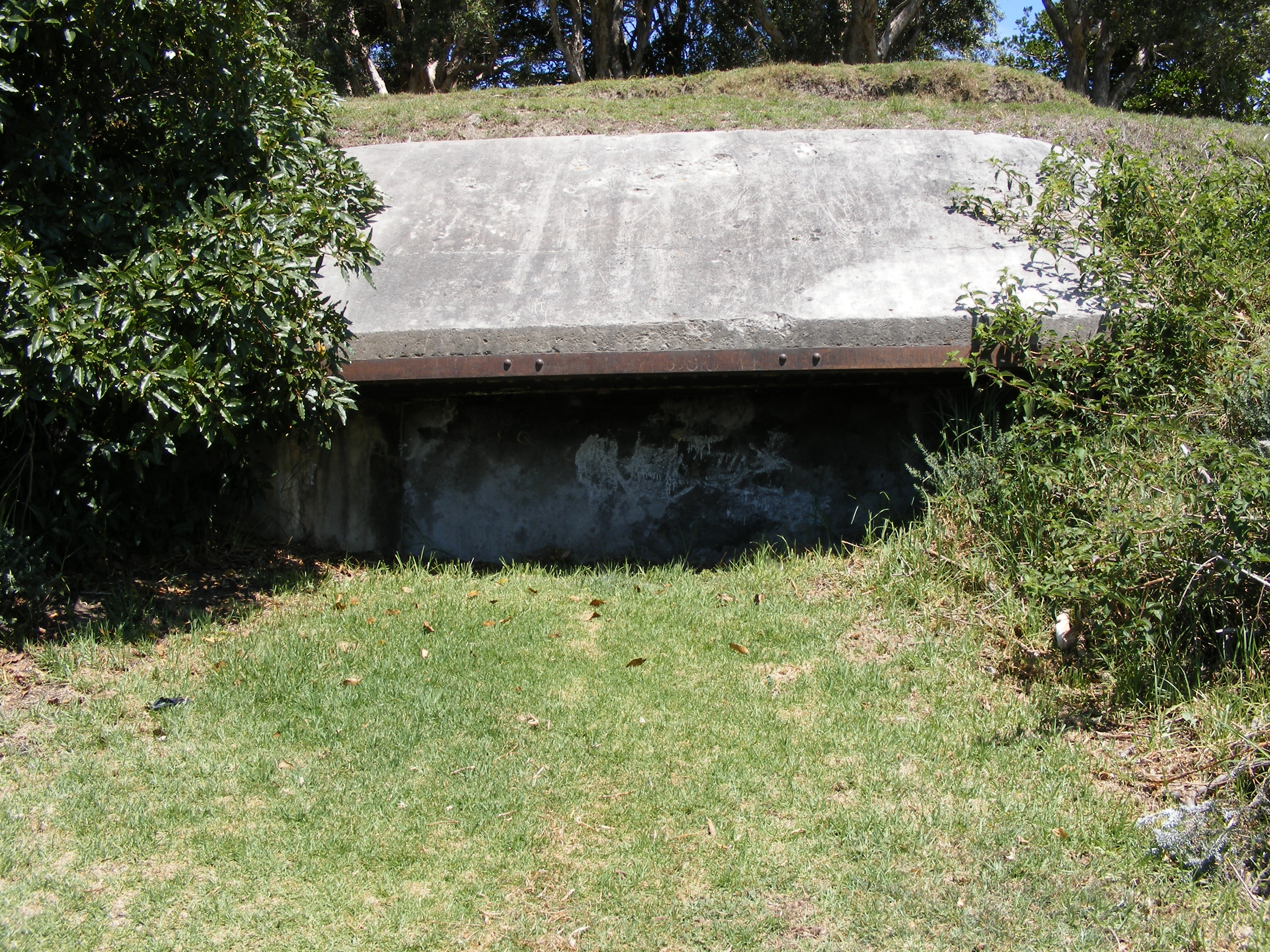
The Green Point Battery, located near the winch house for the anti-submarine net.

=== Boom gates ===
The western gate was usually kept shut and was only opened for very large vessels that were damaged or under tow, which required the use of the deeper and straighter Western Channel. The western gate was opened by a tug boat. All other ships used the eastern gate, which was controlled by the boom gate vessel. The gate was opened by dragging it back to the hauling-back dolphin using winches housed on Laing Point. Another gate for smaller vessels, such as Manly ferries, tugs, yachts, sailing and fishing boats, was lowered to a depth of 5 metres (16 ft) with a winch mounted on board the boom gate vessel. The boom gate vessel used to open these gates was HMAS Kuramia, a converted Sydney Harbour ferry, that had been used for public transportation from 1914.

=== Dimensions ===
Sydney Harbour WWII map showing the boom net's location

The boom was 1,480 metres (4,860 ft) long, with two gate openings for ships. The gate on the Western Channel was 121 metres (397 ft) in length and was used for larger vessels. The gate on the eastern side of the channel (Eastern Channel) was 91 metres (299 ft) long, and, for smaller vessels, there was another gate 30 metres in length located on the western side of the boom gate vessel. The central and western sections of the boom consisted of some 49 clusters of four piles with the net, which were made of wire and interlocking steel rings about 450 millimetres (18 in) in diameter, suspended between them. The eastern, Laing Point, section of the net was suspended from buoys, as were the eastern and western gate nets.

== See also ==
- Anti-submarine boom (Lake Macquarie WWII)
- Military history of Australia
