= MV Aase Maersk =

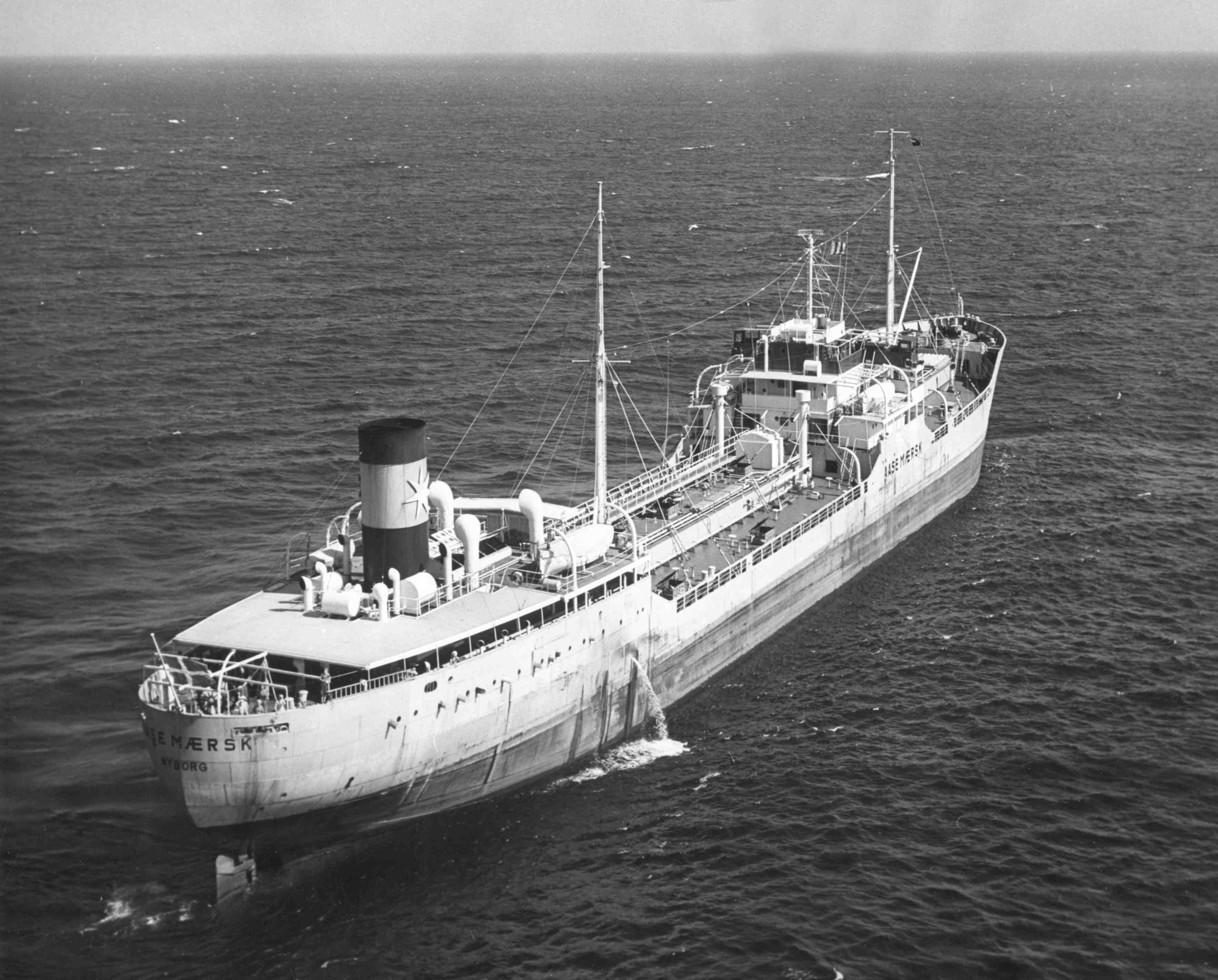
- Aase Mærsk

History

Denmark
- Name: Aase Mærsk
- Owner: Mærsk Line (1930–40, 1945–60); Ministry of War Transport (1940–)
- Operator: Mærsk Line (1930–40, 1945–60); CT Bowring & Co (1940–)
- Port of registry: (United Kingdom) Belfast (1940)
- Builder: Odense Steel Shipyard, Odense, Denmark
- Launched: 25 June 1930
- Completed: September 1930
- Identification: UK official number 174208; Call sign BFXW
- Fate: Scrapped in 1960

General characteristics
- Tonnage: 6,814 GRT; tonnage under deck 5,505; 3,641 NRT
- Length: 407.1 feet (124.1 m) p/p
- Beam: 54.9 feet (16.7 m)
- Draught: 26 feet 10 1/4 inches (8.19 m)
- Depth: 30.4 feet (9.3 m)
- Installed power: 489 NHP
- Propulsion: 6-cylinder 4-stroke single-acting marine diesel engine
- Speed: 11 knots (20 km/h)
- Sensors & processing systems: wireless direction finding

MV Aase Maersk or Aase Mærsk was a Danish 6,184 GRT oil tanker. Odense Steel Shipyard of Odense built her in 1930 for A. P. Moller of Copenhagen. She was a motor ship, powered by a Burmeister & Wain six-cylinder four-stroke single-acting marine diesel engine developing 489 NHP.

== Second World War ==
In the Second World War the UK Ministry of War Transport took her over and appointed C.T. Bowring & Co to manage her. She served with the United States Navy, Royal Australian Navy, and Royal Navy. The Bathurst-class corvette HMAS Geelong collided with her on 11 November 1942. Aase Mærsk was returned to her owners in 1945.

== Fate ==
Aase Mærsk was scrapped at Preston, Lancashire in December 1960.
