= HMAS Nereus =

Australian former luxury and patrol boat

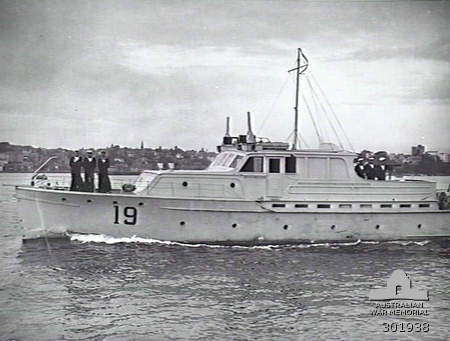
- HMAS Nereus on Sydney Harbour

History

Australia
- Name: Nereus
- Builder: Lars Halvorsen Sons, Neutral Bay
- Launched: 1939

History

Australia
- Name: HMAS Nereus
- Fate: Destroyed by fire in 1942

General characteristics
- Length: 66 feet (20 m)
- Armament: 1 .303 Vickers MG, 4 Depth charges

HMAS Nereus (19) was formerly a luxury motor cruiser, commissioned as a channel patrol boat operated by the Royal Australian Navy (RAN) during World War II. She was one of thirteen similar vessels, known to Sydneysiders as the 'Hollywood Fleet'.

Prior to the War, she was a private vessel built by Lars Halvorsen Sons and launched in 1939. She was 66 feet (20.12m) in length, with a breadth of 16 feet (4.88m) making her one of the larger vessels of the Hollywood Fleet. She was powered by twin Chryslers eight cylinder marine engines, each of 175 hp. She had six cabins, two forward, two amidships and two aft, toilets port and starboard, lounge, saloon, a fore cabin, pantry/galley complete with refrigerator and gas stove, an engine ‘room’ and a bridge control cabin and cockpit. She was built of hardwood laminated timbers with Oregon stringers and planking.

She was requisitioned and fully commissioned into the RAN on 30 December 1941 under the command of Second Lieutenant E B Beeham RANVR. Nereus was armed with .303 Vickers machine guns fore and aft and depth charge racks on the stern.

Nereus played no role in the Attack on Sydney Harbour) and her whereabouts at the time has not been established. However, Muirhead-Gould's (commander of Sydney Harbour) 22 June Report, includes that on the night after the Battle, Nereus attacked and claimed to have sunk a submarine in Vaucluse Bay. At the time of his report, Muirhead-Gould believed the claim was genuine, but later considered the report to be a false sighting.

== Fate ==
On 2 July 1942, just over a month after the Battle of Sydney Harbour, HMAS Nereus was destroyed by fire. At the time, she had just relieved HMAS Yarroma at the buoy in Obelisk Bay, Sydney Harbour.
