= 1954 Sydney to Hobart Yacht Race =

Annual yacht race in Australia

The 1954 Sydney to Hobart Yacht Race was the tenth running of the annual offshore sailing race organised by the Cruising Yacht Club of Australia. The race began in Sydney Harbour, New South Wales, on 26 December 1954 (Boxing Day) and covered a distance of approximately 630 nautical miles to Hobart, Tasmania.

Seventeen yachts started the race, with fifteen finishing. Line honours were awarded to Kurrewa IV, while overall victory on handicap was won by Solveig, a 36-foot yacht designed and built by Lars Halvorsen Sons.

== The Solveig ==
The 36-foot double ender was built in 1950 in Sydney by the Norwegian family business Lars Halvorsen Sons, built of Oregan (Douglas fir) on Australian Hardwood frames. 1954 was the fifth and last Sydney to Hobart Yacht Race that Solveig entered, as she was shipped to the West Coast of the United States in 1955 to compete in the then longest ocean race in the world, the Transpac from San Pedro, Los Angeles to Diamond Head, Hawaii. After the race Solveig was sold to a local businessman Don Doyle and remained in Hawaii from 1955 until 2017. Her last American owner, Lawrence "Chip" Wheeler, had her for ten years, during which time he performed a much-needed refit and made modifications to the boat for blue water cruising. In January 2107, she was shipped by container ship from Honolulu to Sydney by the then Commodore of the Halvorsen Club, restored to original lines and is now racing and sailing on Sydney Harbour in a fleet of classic yachts.

== Other Participants ==
"Eight inter-State yachts and seven from New South Wales have been entered. The N.S.W. entries are: Patience (35 foot sloop), White Cloud (48ft. cutter), Wraith of Odin (57ft. ketch), Gypsy Queen (42ft. cutter), Carol J. (40ft. sloop), Solveig (36ft. cutter), and Defiance (50ft. cutter). Victoria: The 64ft. cutter Kurrewa IV, formerly Morna. Royal Australian Navy entry, Tam O'Shanter, and the yawl Landfall. Tasmania: The staysail schooners Brilliant and Wanderer, and the 75ft. cutter Niripa. Queensland: The 43ft. Bermudan ketch, Laura Bada. South Australia: The 41ft. sloop, Southern Myth." - Advocate, Nov 26, 1954
