= List of ships built by Hall, Russell & Company (601–700) =

List of ships built by Aberdeen shipbuilders Hall, Russell & Company, from yard number 601 to 700.

The ships built in the sequence 601 to 700 cover the period 1917 to 1929. The majority of vessels built during this period were armed trawlers for the Admiralty, fishing vessels for British owners, and a number of cargo vessels, such as those built for the North of Scotland, Orkney & Shetland Steam Navigation Company.

List of Hall, Russell & Company built ships (601–700)
Name	Image	Yard Number	Construction	Type	Year	Length Overall	Breadth	Depth	Tonnage	Ref(s)
Ben Namur		601		Trawler - Steam	1919	122 feet 4 inches (37.29 m)	22 feet 1 inch (6.73 m)	13 feet 3 inches (4.04 m)		
William Barlow		606	Steel	Trawler - Steam	1917	122 feet 4 inches (37.29 m)	22 feet 1 inch (6.73 m)	12 feet 4 inches (3.76 m)	237 long tons (241 t)	
John Bradford		607	Steel	Trawler - Steam	1917	122 feet 4 inches (37.29 m)	22 feet 1 inch (6.73 m)	13 feet 3 inches (4.04 m)	226 long tons (230 t)	
William Browning	William Browning (as HMT Madden) underway	608	Steel	Trawler - Steam	1917	122 feet 4 inches (37.29 m)	22 feet 1 inch (6.73 m)	12 feet 4 inches (3.76 m)	237 long tons (241 t)	
Richard Bennett		609	Steel	Trawler - Steam	1917	122 feet 4 inches (37.29 m)	22 feet 1 inch (6.73 m)	12 feet 4 inches (3.76 m)	237 long tons (241 t)	
Samuel Baker		610		Trawler - Steam	1917	115 feet 3 inches (35.13 m)	22 feet 1 inch (6.73 m)	12 feet 9 inches (3.89 m)	194 long tons (197 t)	
George Borthwick		611	Steel	Trawler - Steam	1917	115 feet 4 inches (35.15 m)	22 feet 1 inch (6.73 m)	13 feet (4.0 m)	202 long tons (205 t)	
James Bentole	James Bentole (as HMT Fort Robert) underway	612	Steel	Trawler - Steam	1917	115 feet 4 inches (35.15 m)	22 feet 1 inch (6.73 m)	14 feet (4.3 m)	203 long tons (206 t)	
Thomas Bird		613	Steel	Trawler - Steam	1917	115 feet 4 inches (35.15 m)	22 feet 1 inch (6.73 m)	13 feet 6 inches (4.11 m)	203 long tons (206 t)	
John Barry		614	Steel	Trawler - Steam	1917	115 feet 3 inches (35.13 m)	22 feet 1 inch (6.73 m)	13 feet (4.0 m)	203 long tons (206 t)	
Thomas Bryan		615	Steel	Trawler - Steam	1917	115 feet 3 inches (35.13 m)	22 feet 1 inch (6.73 m)	13 feet (4.0 m)	216 long tons (219 t)	
William Biggs		616	Steel	Trawler - Steam	1917	115 feet 3 inches (35.13 m)	22 feet 1 inch (6.73 m)	13 feet (4.0 m)	203 long tons (206 t)	
John Braskett		617	Steel	Trawler - Steam	1917	115 feet 3 inches (35.13 m)	22 feet 1 inch (6.73 m)	13 feet (4.0 m)	203 long tons (206 t)	
Samuel Barkas		618	Steel	Trawler - Steam	1917	115 feet 3 inches (35.13 m)	22 feet 1 inch (6.73 m)	13 feet (4.0 m)	216 long tons (219 t)	
William Butler		619	Steel	Trawler - Steam	1917	115 feet 3 inches (35.13 m)	22 feet 1 inch (6.73 m)	13 feet (4.0 m)	203 long tons (206 t)	
James Beagan		620	Steel	Trawler - Steam	1917	115 feet 3 inches (35.13 m)	22 feet 1 inch (6.73 m)	13 feet (4.0 m)	203 long tons (206 t)	
Brazil Brasby		621	Steel	Trawler - Steam	1917	115 feet 3 inches (35.13 m)	22 feet 1 inch (6.73 m)	13 feet (4.0 m)	203 long tons (206 t)	
William Barnett		622	Steel	Trawler - Steam	1917	115 feet 3 inches (35.13 m)	22 feet 1 inch (6.73 m)	13 feet (4.0 m)	216 long tons (219 t)	
George Burton	George Burton (as HMT Bervie Braes) underway at Devonport	623	Steel	Trawler - Steam	1917	115 feet 3 inches (35.13 m)	22 feet 1 inch (6.73 m)	13 feet (4.0 m)	203 long tons (206 t)	
William Bond		624	Steel	Trawler - Steam	1918	115 feet 4 inches (35.15 m)	22 feet 1 inch (6.73 m)	13 feet 6 inches (4.11 m)	203 long tons (206 t)	
John Bell		625	Steel	Trawler - Steam	1918	115 feet 3 inches (35.13 m)	22 feet 1 inch (6.73 m)	13 feet (4.0 m)	203 long tons (206 t)	
Joseph Burgin		626	Steel	Trawler - Steam	1918	115 feet 3 inches (35.13 m)	22 feet 1 inch (6.73 m)	13 feet (4.0 m)	203 long tons (206 t)	
John Bowler		627	Steel	Trawler - Steam	1918	115 feet 3 inches (35.13 m)	22 feet 1 inch (6.73 m)	13 feet (4.0 m)	203 long tons (206 t)	
Henry Butcher		628	Steel	Trawler - Steam	1918	115 feet 3 inches (35.13 m)	22 feet 1 inch (6.73 m)	13 feet (4.0 m)	203 long tons (206 t)	
David Buchan		629	Steel	Trawler - Steam	1918	115 feet 3 inches (35.13 m)	22 feet 1 inch (6.73 m)	13 feet (4.0 m)	203 long tons (206 t)	
William Barrow		630	Steel	Trawler - Steam	1918	115 feet 3 inches (35.13 m)	22 feet 1 inch (6.73 m)	13 feet (4.0 m)	204 long tons (207 t)	
Timothy Brannon		631	Steel	Trawler - Steam	1918	115 feet 4 inches (35.15 m)	22 feet 1 inch (6.73 m)	13 feet (4.0 m)	203 long tons (206 t)	
Bernard Boyle		632	Steel	Trawler - Steam	1918	115 feet 4 inches (35.15 m)	22 feet 1 inch (6.73 m)	12 feet 1 inch (3.68 m)	203 long tons (206 t)	
David Blake		633	Steel	Trawler - Steam	1918	115 feet 3 inches (35.13 m)	22 feet 1 inch (6.73 m)	13 feet (4.0 m)	203 long tons (206 t)	
William Beaumont		634	Steel	Trawler - Steam	1918	115 feet 4 inches (35.15 m)	22 feet 1 inch (6.73 m)	14 feet (4.3 m)	203 long tons (206 t)	
Samuel Benbow		635	Steel	Trawler - Steam	1918	115 feet 3 inches (35.13 m)	22 feet 1 inch (6.73 m)	13 feet (4.0 m)	203 long tons (206 t)	
Kilburn		636	Steel	Patrol gunboat Kil-class sloop	1918	172 feet 5 inches (52.55 m)	30 feet (9.1 m)	15 feet 7 inches (4.75 m)	643 long tons (653 t)	
Kilbride	HMS Kilbride in dazzle camouflage	637	Steel	Patrol gunboat Kil-class sloop	1918	175 feet 4 inches (53.44 m)	30 feet (9.1 m)	15 feet 9 inches (4.80 m)	568 long tons (577 t)	
Thomas Burnham		642	Steel	Trawler - Steam	1918	115 feet 4 inches (35.15 m)	22 feet 1 inch (6.73 m)	12 feet 1 inch (3.68 m)	203 long tons (206 t)	
John Butler		643	Steel	Trawler - Steam	1918	115 feet 4 inches (35.15 m)	22 feet 1 inch (6.73 m)	12 feet 1 inch (3.68 m)	203 long tons (206 t)	
Thomas Barclay		644	Steel	Trawler - Steam	1918	115 feet 4 inches (35.15 m)	22 feet 1 inch (6.73 m)	12 feet 1 inch (3.68 m)	203 long tons (206 t)	
Richard Briscoll		645	Steel	Trawler - Steam	1918	115 feet 4 inches (35.15 m)	22 feet 1 inch (6.73 m)	12 feet 1 inch (3.68 m)	203 long tons (206 t)	
James Brodigan		646	Steel	Trawler - Steam	1918	115 feet 4 inches (35.15 m)	22 feet 1 inch (6.73 m)	12 feet 1 inch (3.68 m)	203 long tons (206 t)	
Edward Barker		647	Steel	Trawler - Steam	1918	115 feet 4 inches (35.15 m)	22 feet 1 inch (6.73 m)	12 feet 1 inch (3.68 m)	203 long tons (206 t)	
Jonathan Bazino		648		Trawler - Steam	1919	115 feet 4 inches (35.15 m)	22 feet 1 inch (6.73 m)	12 feet 1 inch (3.68 m)	203 long tons (206 t)	
William Bentley		649	Steel	Trawler - Steam	1919	115 feet 4 inches (35.15 m)	22 feet 1 inch (6.73 m)	12 feet 1 inch (3.68 m)	203 long tons (206 t)	
Peter Barrington		650	Steel	Trawler - Steam	1919	115 feet 4 inches (35.15 m)	22 feet 1 inch (6.73 m)	12 feet 1 inch (3.68 m)	202 long tons (205 t)	
Charles Blight		651	Steel	Trawler - Steam	1919	115 feet 4 inches (35.15 m)	22 feet 1 inch (6.73 m)	12 feet 1 inch (3.68 m)	202 long tons (205 t)	
Joshua Budget		652	Steel	Trawler - Steam	1919	115 feet 7 inches (35.23 m)	21 feet 9 inches (6.63 m)	10 feet 8 inches (3.25 m)	208 long tons (211 t)	
Richard Bowden		653	Steel	Trawler - Steam	1919	115 feet 6 inches (35.20 m)	21 feet 9 inches (6.63 m)	10 feet 8 inches (3.25 m)	208 long tons (211 t)	
John Britton		654	Steel	Trawler - Steam	1919	115 feet 6 inches (35.20 m)	21 feet 9 inches (6.63 m)	10 feet 8 inches (3.25 m)	208 long tons (211 t)	
Thomas Billincole		655	Steel	Trawler - Steam	1919	115 feet 4 inches (35.15 m)	22 feet 1 inch (6.73 m)	12 feet 1 inch (3.68 m)	202 long tons (205 t)	
Thomas Billincole		656	Steel	Trawler - Steam	1919	115 feet 4 inches (35.15 m)	22 feet 1 inch (6.73 m)	12 feet 1 inch (3.68 m)	202 long tons (205 t)	
Michael Brion		657	Steel	Trawler - Steam	1919	115 feet 4 inches (35.15 m)	22 feet 1 inch (6.73 m)	12 feet 1 inch (3.68 m)	202 long tons (205 t)	
Ferryhill		673	Steel	Cargo - Collier (Coal)	1919	221 feet 1 inch (67.39 m)	33 feet 4 inches (10.16 m)	14 feet (4.3 m)	1,086 long tons (1,103 t)	
Simon Duhamel		674	Steel	Trawler - Steam	1920	170 feet 2 inches (51.87 m)	27 feet 1 inch (8.26 m)	14 feet 2 inches (4.32 m)	585 long tons (594 t)	
Cap Fagnet		675	Steel	Trawler - Steam	1920	170 feet 2 inches (51.87 m)	27 feet 1 inch (8.26 m)	14 feet (4.3 m)	585 long tons (594 t)	
Ebro		676	Steel	Cargo Steamer	1920	237 feet 2 inches (72.29 m)	36 feet 1 inch (11.00 m)	14 feet (4.3 m)	1,066 long tons (1,083 t)	
Lisbon		677	Steel	Cargo Steamer	1920	250 feet 8 inches (76.40 m)	38 feet 2 inches (11.63 m)	17 feet 1 inch (5.21 m)	1,964 long tons (1,996 t)	
Estrellano		678	Steel	Cargo Steamer	1920	250 feet 8 inches (76.40 m)	38 feet 2 inches (11.63 m)	17 feet 1 inch (5.21 m)	1,963 long tons (1,995 t)	
Maryland		679	Steel	Cargo Steamer	1921	362 feet 2 inches (110.39 m)	50 feet 2 inches (15.29 m)	31 feet 6 inches (9.60 m)	4,895 long tons (4,974 t)	
Draco		680	Steel	Cargo Steamer	1922	274 feet 7 inches (83.69 m)	39 feet 3 inches (11.96 m)	18 feet 5 inches (5.61 m)	2,017 long tons (2,049 t)	
Bois Rosé		682	Steel	Trawler - Steam	1923	170 feet (52 m)	27 feet 1 inch (8.26 m)	14 feet 1 inch (4.29 m)	608 long tons (618 t)	
St. Magnus		683	Steel	Passenger and Cargo	1924	240 feet 6 inches (73.30 m)	36 feet 2 inches (11.02 m)	16 feet 9 inches (5.11 m)	1,529 long tons (1,554 t)	
Disa		684	Steel	Trawler - Steam	1924	115 feet 1 inch (35.08 m)	22 feet 1 inch (6.73 m)	12 feet (3.7 m)	197 long tons (200 t)	
Strathgarry		685	Steel	Trawler - Steam	1924	115 feet 7 inches (35.23 m)	22 feet 2 inches (6.76 m)	12 feet 2 inches (3.71 m)	202 long tons (205 t)	
Strathleven		686	Steel	Trawler - Steam	1924	115 feet 7 inches (35.23 m)	22 feet 2 inches (6.76 m)	12 feet 2 inches (3.71 m)	202 long tons (205 t)	
Kildrummy		687	Steel	Cargo - Coaster	1924	175 feet 9 inches (53.57 m)	27 feet 3 inches (8.31 m)	11 feet 3 inches (3.43 m)	629 long tons (639 t)	
Nerine		688	Steel	Trawler - Steam	1925	115 feet 2 inches (35.10 m)	22 feet 1 inch (6.73 m)	12 feet (3.7 m)	197 long tons (200 t)	
Arum		689	Steel	Trawler - Steam	1926	115 feet 1 inch (35.08 m)	22 feet 1 inch (6.73 m)	12 feet (3.7 m)	194 long tons (197 t)	
Larut		690	Steel	Passenger and Cargo	1927	214 feet 4 inches (65.33 m)	35 feet 7 inches (10.85 m)	11 feet 7 inches (3.53 m)	839 long tons (852 t)	
Senateur Duhamel		691	Steel	Trawler - Steam	1927	192 feet 3 inches (58.60 m)	31 feet 1 inch (9.47 m)	16 feet 1 inch (4.90 m)	913 long tons (928 t)	
Galerna		692	Steel	Trawler - Steam	1927	216 feet 3 inches (65.91 m)	34 feet 6 inches (10.52 m)	16 feet 7 inches (5.05 m)	1,164 long tons (1,183 t)	
Vendaval		693	Steel	Trawler - Steam	1927	216 feet 3 inches (65.91 m)	34 feet 6 inches (10.52 m)	16 feet 6 inches (5.03 m)	1,164 long tons (1,183 t)	
Earl Thorfinn		694	Steel	Passenger and Cargo	1928	150 feet 7 inches (45.90 m)	27 feet 2 inches (8.28 m)	11 feet 5 inches (3.48 m)	345 long tons (351 t)	
St. Clement		695	Steel	Cargo - Coaster	1928	156 feet 3 inches (47.63 m)	25 feet 6 inches (7.77 m)	9 feet 8 inches (2.95 m)	450 long tons (460 t)	
Strathgyle		696	Steel	Trawler - Steam	1928	117 feet 5 inches (35.79 m)	22 feet 1 inch (6.73 m)	12 feet 2 inches (3.71 m)	218 long tons (221 t)	
Strathlyon		697	Steel	Trawler - Steam	1928	117 feet 5 inches (35.79 m)	22 feet 1 inch (6.73 m)	12 feet 2 inches (3.71 m)	218 long tons (221 t)	
Isabella Greig		698	Steel	Trawler - Steam	1928	115 feet 7 inches (35.23 m)	22 feet 1 inch (6.73 m)	12 feet 1 inch (3.68 m)	210 long tons (210 t)	
Margaret Clark		699	Steel	Trawler - Steam	1929	130 feet 9 inches (39.85 m)	23 feet 1 inch (7.04 m)	12 feet 5 inches (3.78 m)	288 long tons (293 t)	
Joseph Duhamel		700	Steel	Trawler - Steam	1929	190 feet 6 inches (58.06 m)	31 feet 1 inch (9.47 m)	17 feet 5 inches (5.31 m)	928 long tons (943 t)	

== Notes ==
- Where available, vessel measurements taken from Lloyd's Register, giving registered length, beam and draft. Hall, Russell and Company's own measurements typically are length overall, beam and moulded depth.
- Yard Numbers 602-605 unused
- Yard Numbers 638-641 likely allocated to the cancelled order for four additional Kil-class sloops. Two built (636 and 637), third vessel, HMS Kilcavan was named but cancelled and three other vessels were cancelled before being named.
- Yard Numbers 658-672 likely allocated to additional trawlers for Admiralty, cancelled at the end of World War I
- Yard Number 681 unused

== Bibliography ==
- Cocker, Maurice (1985). Frigates, Sloops and Patrol Vessels of the Royal Navy (1900 to date). Kendal, England: Westmorland Gazette. pp. 26–27. ISBN 9780902272521.
