= Hankyu Sasaki =

Sasaki Hankyu
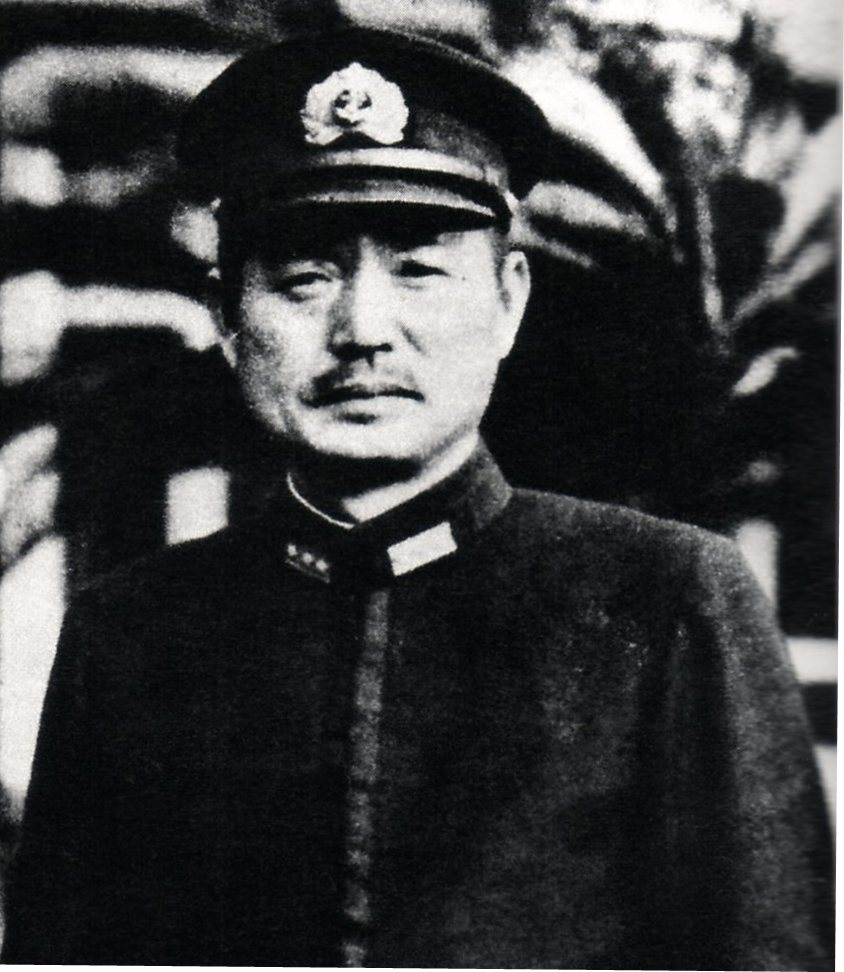
- Native name: 佐々木 半九
- Born: 1 January 1896
- Died: October 6, 1971 (aged 75)
- Allegiance: Empire of Japan
- Branch: Imperial Japanese Navy
- Service years: 1917–1945
- Rank: Rear Admiral

Hankyu Sasaki (佐々木 半九, 1 January 1896 – 6 October 1971) was an Imperial Japanese Navy admiral. During World War II he was force commander of the midget submarines that attacked Pearl Harbor and Sydney Harbour.

== Early career ==
Sasaki was born in Hiroshima. He attended Hiroshima Prefectural Tertiary High School and then joined Class 45 of the Japanese Naval Academy at Etajima on 24 November 1917. When he graduated he went to the Naval Torpedo School followed by the Navy diving school. He became a lieutenant in the submarine school, and was then promoted to lieutenant commander. As a commander he served as instructor at the diving school and the torpedo school. He was then assigned to the Kamoi, the Yakumo, and served as deputy commander in the Navy Air Service. He became the first commander of the 21st Submarine Division. After promotion to captain, he served as commander of the 12th Submarine Division followed by the 7th Submarine Division.

== Midget submarines ==
In July 1941 Sasaki became the commander of the 3rd Submarine Division. Five of the corps midget submarines from I-16, I-18, I-20, I-22 and I-24 attacked Pearl Harbor. Sasaki's next involvement was the attack on Sydney Harbour with midget submarines from the Eastern Attack Group's submarines I-22, I-24 and I-27 in May 1942. They were also accompanied by I-21 and I-28, which had been fitted for reconnaissance aircraft.

In October, Sasaki was assigned to Matsumura's I-21 in Sixth Fleet chief of staff, Rear Admiral Hisashi Mito's E-force. Its mission was to locate and sink the damaged US aircraft carrier Enterprise, which had been damaged in the Battle of the Santa Cruz Islands. The floatplane from I-9 found the Enterprise in Nouméa harbour and a watch was maintained waiting for the carrier to sail. While waiting I-9, which had the best floatplane was withdrawn by the navy for other duties, which meant that the Enterprise had sailed by the time the floatplane from I-21 overflew the harbour. E-force had lost its opportunity and Sasaki returned to Truk in November.

In January 1943, Sasaki was the submarine school's vice-principal.

== Kaiten ==
Sasaki began development of the 1st Special Attack Corps, a Kaiten squad, in July 1944. Kaiten were officially adopted as a weapon on August 1, 1944. Sasaki and Commander Torisu Kennosuke (鳥巣 建之助) developed the strategy for their training and use, primarily against ships at anchor.

Sasaki was promoted to rear admiral in October 1944, and became the Sixth Fleet's chief of staff.

== Career ==
Year	Rank	Position	Location	Comment
1 April 1923	Lieutenant			
1 April 1928		Commanding Officer	Ro-56	
30 November 1929	Lieutenant Commander	Commanding Officer	Ro-62	
1 December 1930			Ro-64	
1 December 1931		Chief Executive Officer	I-165	
5 April 1932		Commanding Officer		
15 November 1934	Commander	unknown	unknown	
15 December 1938		Commanding Officer	Submarine Division 21	
15 November 1939	Captain	Commanding Officer	Submarine Division 12	
19 October 1940		Commanding Officer	Submarine Division 7	
15 July 1941		Commanding Officer	Submarine Division 3	5 midget submarines attacked Pearl Harbour
15 December 1942		unknown	unknown	
15 October 1944	Rear Admiral			
21 December 1944		Chief of Staff	6th Fleet	
