= Lake Macquarie anti-submarine boom =

WWII defensive boom in Australia

The Lake Macquarie anti-submarine boom was a submarine and small boat defence boom located at the entrance to Lake Macquarie, New South Wales, Australia during World War II.

It spanned the entire width of the lake channel between Grannies Pool, Blacksmiths and Lucy's Wall, Swansea Heads. It was built to protect the large flying boat base, RAAF Rathmines at Rathmines and as part of southern perimeter defence of Fortress Newcastle.

The boom was constructed with a series of poles embedded within the lake channel supported by a net of steel cables. A gap in the boom could be raised with the aid of winches. A pill box and machine gun emplacement were constructed at the Blacksmiths (northern) end of the boom. Trenches zigzagged between Swansea Heads and Caves Beach on the southern side.

== See also ==
- Sydney Harbour anti-submarine boom net
