= Lars Halvorsen Sons =

Boat building company

- Industry: Boatbuilding
- Founded: 1925
- Founder: Lars Halvorsen
- Headquarters: Sydney, Australia
- Subsidiaries: Kong & Halvorsen Marine & Engineering Company

Lars Halvorsen Sons was an Australian pleasure craft and boat building company.

== Early history ==
Halvorsen Boats traces its roots to 1887 when Halvor Andersen, a farmer, launched his first wooden craft near Arendal in the south of Norway. His son Lars followed in his father's footsteps and became a boat builder. After Lars lost his fortune in the post World War I recession, with the sinking of his uninsured sailing ship Nidelv, the first of her voyages not to be insured, Lars moved from Norway to Cape Town, South Africa in 1922 to start over. Lars built a successful boatbuilding and repair business but, with five sons, realised there would not be enough business there to create the family business he envisioned.

== History ==
Lars and his eldest son Harold moved to Sydney, Australia, in late 1924, and the rest of the family arrived at the end of December. From 1925 through 1976 the family enterprise built 1,299 craft, the first, Sirius, from a slipway in Drummoyne and then from yards in Neutral Bay before moving to larger premises on the Parramatta River in Ryde.

During World War II, many Halvorsen built pleasure cruisers served in the Volunteer Coastal Patrol and later Naval Auxiliary Patrol. Eight of their larger luxury cruisers; Penelope, Miramar, Nereus, Sea Mist, Silver Cloud, Steady Hour, Toomeree and Winbah were commissioned into the RAN as Channel Patrol Boats (CPB) and formed part of the 'Hollywood Fleet' in Sydney. The Halvorsens built more than 250 boats for the American, Netherlands, and Australian armed forces, employing a staff of over 350 tradesmen. During World War II, 178 air-sea rescue Halvorsen craft were built Halvorsens also built 16 112-foot Fairmile B motor launches for the war effort. These saw active service in the north of Australia and in the New Guinea area.

When Lars died in 1936, his family (including his widow, Bergithe, and daughters) shared ownership, equally, of the business. Eldest son Harold took over as managing director of the newly formed company, Lars Halvorsen Sons Pty Ltd, and continued as designer for most of the wartime vessels as well as commercial and pleasure boats, while his four brothers took responsibility for other areas of the business. In recognition of his contribution to the war effort Harold was awarded the Order of Australia Medal in 2000, while previously Carl Halvorsen had been made a Knight First Class of the Royal Norwegian Order of Merit by King Harald in 1991. Others received the Australian Sports Medal.

After World War II, the company acquired a lease at Bobbin Head located north of Sydney in the Ku-ring-gai Chase National Park. The family built a fleet of hire boats. The hire boat operation was the southern hemisphere's largest privately owned fleet of its time. On 9 April 2000, ninety of their classic boats held a regatta on the Hawkesbury River to mark the 75th anniversary of the arrival of the family in Australia and Harold Halvorsen's 90th birthday. Harold died in November of that year.

== America's Cup ==
In 1962, Lars Halvorsen Sons built 12-metre yacht Gretel for Frank Packer, the first Australian challenger for the America's Cup. Magnus and Trygve Halvorsen crewed in the challenge, Trygve becoming the team's manager.

== Sydney to Hobart ==
In 1963, 1964, and 1965, Trygve and Magnus Halvorsen, as joint skippers, won three Sydney to Hobart races, on handicap, while sailing Freya, designed by Trygve and built by Lars Halvorsen Sons. As of 2024, this achievement had not been equalled.

== Global expansion ==
In the 1960s Harold's son Harvey Halvorsen became the company designer, and in 1975 formed Kong & Halvorsen Marine & Engineering Company, a joint venture between Lars Halvorsen Sons and Joseph Kong, former general manager of American Marine Company, in Hong Kong to design, build and market a new range of pleasure boats worldwide. Over the next two decades, hundreds of craft ranging from 30 to 134 ft (9.1 to 40.8 m) were built under the Kong & Halvorsen, Island Gypsy, and Halvorsen brand names.

Over 900 Halvorsen Boats have been built in China and exported worldwide. In 2000, Kong & Halvorsen Marine's 20-year contract with the Chinese government expired, and the factory was closed. However, Harvey and his son Mark Halvorsen continued to build boats by contracting to approved yards where they launched two additional new models, the Gourmet Cruiser and the Solo, a passage maker.

== Present ==
In 2004–05, the Australian National Maritime Museum held an exhibition on Halvorsen Boats entitled Dream Boats and Work Boats – The Halvorsen Story. Mark Halvorsen owns Halvorsen Boat Sales in Sydney Australia which has largely become a boat importing business and specialist in the restoration of vintage Halvorsen Boats. Mark still designs and has his boats built in various yards in southern China. His father Harvey sold off the family marina in Australia in July 2006. Harvey Halvorsen died in March 2021.

== In popular culture ==
A 134 ft (41 m) Kong & Halvorsen Motor yacht called Yecats appeared in the 1987 film Overboard starring Kurt Russell and Goldie Hawn. The same boat renamed Attessa appeared in the 1993 film Indecent Proposal starring Woody Harrelson, Robert Redford and Demi Moore.

The 36 ft (11 m) Kangaroo periodically appears in Australian television series Home & Away as The Blaxland.
