= HMAS Samuel Benbow =

Australian naval minesweeper during WW II

History
- Name: Samuel Benbow
- Owner: A. A. Davidson; A. A. Murrell; Cam & Sons Pty Ltd
- Builder: Hall, Russell & Company, Aberdeen, Scotland
- Yard number: 635
- Launched: 1918

History

Australia
- Name: Samuel Benbow
- Commissioned: 5 September 1940
- Decommissioned: 24 May 1946
- Fate: Returned to owners in 1946

General characteristics
- Tonnage: 122 gross tonnage
- Length: 115.4 ft (35 m)
- Beam: 22.1 ft (7 m)
- Depth: 12.1 ft (4 m)
- Speed: 8 knots
- Armament: 1 × 12-pdr; 1 Oerlikon; 1 Vickers machine gun

HMAS Samuel Benbow was an auxiliary minesweeper operated by the Royal Australian Navy (RAN) during World War II. She was launched in 1918 by Hall, Russell & Company, Aberdeen. She was a Strath class trawler admiralty design. The ship operated in Australian waters from 1929, and was requisitioned by the RAN and commissioned on 5 September 1940. She was resold to her former owners after the war.

== Operational history ==
Samuel Benbow was launched in 1918 by Hall, Russell & Company, Aberdeen. She was registered to the Royal Navy Admiralty in November of 1919. She operated in UK waters until 1928 when she was purchased by A. A. Murrell and sailed to Australia. She was sold on to Cam and Sons Pty Ltd in 1940

With the outbreak of World War II, she was requisitioned by the RAN. On 5 September 1940, Samuel Benbow was commissioned by the RAN for use as an auxiliary minesweeper. Samuel Benbow was in Sydney Harbour during the attack on Sydney Harbour on 31 May-1 June 1942.

On the evening of 1 June 1942, the Samuel Benbow was tethered to the sunken Japanese Midget Submarine No. 21. The following morning, on 2 June 1942, efforts by the Samuel Benbow to tow the submarine towards the shore were unsuccessful. Subsequently, the submarine was maneuvered into shallow waters using sheerlegs and slings, and salvaged.

In September 1944, the vessel was deployed to Thursday Island, where it undertook various duties. Throughout the remainder of World War II, it operated primarily in the waters of Queensland. The ship was repurposed as a survey vessel in 1945.

She was resold to her former owners 24 May 1946 and resumed trawling. She was adrift for nine hours after her propeller was fouled by her nets on 14 January 1951, before being towed into Sydney by Goonambee. Her captain drowned after being caught in her nets in November 1952.
