= HMAS Seamist =

History

Australia
- Name: Sea Mist
- Builder: Lars Halvorsen Sons, Neutral Bay
- Completed: 1939

History

Australia
- Name: Seamist
- Honours and awards: Battle honours: Pacific 1942
- Fate: Sold

General characteristics
- Armament: 2 .303 Vickers MG, 4 Depth charges

HMAS Seamist (10) (Note: her commissioned name was HMAS Seamist, not Sea Mist as recorded on some Navy websites) was formerly a Sydney-based luxury motor cruiser, commissioned as a channel patrol boat into and operated by the Royal Australian Navy (RAN) during World War II. She was one of thirteen similar vessels, known to Sydney siders as the 'Hollywood Fleet'.

Sea Mist as she was previously named, was and still is a 65 ft cruiser built by Lars Halvorsen Sons and launched on 14 August 1939. Whilst some reports indicate she was built for Oliver Triggs, the founder of Meadow Lea, or for motor racing identity Hope Bartlett, she was in fact built for Mr and Mrs Gale of Potts Point. She was subsequently purchased by Hope Bartlett before she was requisitioned by the RAN.

Sea Mist was requisitioned on 17 June 1941, and commissioned by the RAN on 21 July 1941 as HMAS Seamist, (An earlier Sea Mist, previously owned by the Gale's was also acquired by the RAN and later sold to the USN as Sea Mist) under the command of Sub-Lieutenant John A Doyle RANR(S).

During the Battle of Sydney Harbour (often referred to as the attack on Sydney Harbour) by the Imperial Japanese Navy on 31 May and 1 June 1942, Seamist, at approx. 5.00am whilst patrolling between Bradleys Head and the boom net, investigated an object in Taylors Bay. On realising it was the conning tower of the midget submarine (M-21), her commander Reg Andrew bought Seamist to the place where the submarine had just submerged and dropped a depth charge. The blast inverted and blew the submarine to the surface. Seamist returned and dropped a second depth charge, so close that Andrew later said he could have stepped on to the inverted hull of the submarine.

The second blast, however, lifted one of Seamist's engines off its mountings and she had to retire. Following a delay, her sister ships of the Hollywood Fleet, HMAS Steady Hour and HMAS Yarroma, commenced a search and on obtaining a 'contact', 1 hour and 30 minutes after Andrew's attacks, at approx. 6.40am dropped further depth charges. Credit for the destruction of the submarine was incorrectly given to HMAS Steady Hour and HMAS Yarroma. However subsequent investigations identified it was Seamist's decisive attacks that caught the submarine and effectively destroyed her. Had Seamist not done so, M-21 would have escaped Taylors Bay, and would not have later been detected by Steady Hour and Yarroma.

In March 1944 Seamist was transferred to the Naval Auxiliary Patrol unit of the RAN, and following a refit in Sydney, she was assigned as an Air Sea Rescue vessel for duty at Darwin. On arrival, Seamist was allotted to Melville Bay for air-sea rescue duties, 650 km to the east from where she had just sailed. On 26 February 1945, with Steady Hour and the former three-masted coastal trader Alma Doepel, she departed Darwin for Thursday Island and Townsville for a refit. On 3 March 1945, she was at Melville Bay when Steady Hour was destroyed by fire whilst refueling.

Seamist arrived at Brisbane on 20 May 1945 for her ‘general refit’ and by September, with no further naval commitment for her, she was directed to Sydney. She departed under tow by HMAS Koala and arrived in Sydney on 8 October 1945. She was ‘paid off’ on 9 November 1945 for disposal. Seamist was re-purchased by Hope Bartlett, and was later owned by a succession owners, including the legendary Australian radio broadcaster Jack Davey who purchased her in 1954 as Sea Mist, selling her in 1958 a year before his death.

Today (2020) she remains afloat and in use.

HMAS Seamist was awarded Battle Honours, "Pacific 1942" for her role during the Battle of Sydney Harbour.
