= HMAS Geelong (J201) =

1941 Bathurst-class corvette

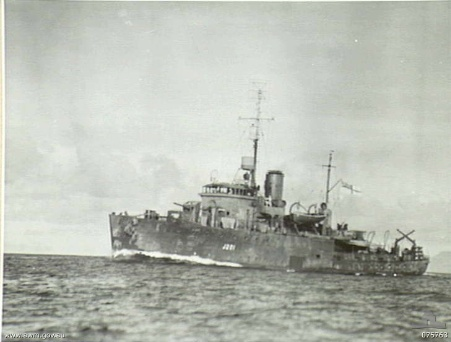
- HMAS Geelong traveling at full speed while escorting a convoy off New Guinea in September 1944

History

Australia
- Namesake: City of Geelong, Victoria
- Builder: HMA Naval Dockyard
- Laid down: 16 October 1940
- Launched: 22 April 1941
- Commissioned: 16 January 1942
- Honours and awards: Battle honours; Pacific 1942–44; New Guinea 1944
- Fate: Lost following a collision, 18 October 1944
- Badge

General characteristics
- Class & type: Bathurst-class corvette
- Displacement: 650 tons (standard), 1,025 tons (full war load)
- Length: 186 ft (57 m)
- Beam: 31 ft (9.4 m)
- Draught: 8.5 ft (2.6 m)
- Propulsion: triple expansion engine, 2 shafts, 1,750 hp
- Speed: 15 knots (28 km/h; 17 mph) at 1,750 hp
- Complement: 85
- Armament: 1 × 4 inch Mk XIX gun; 3 × 20 mm Oerlikons; Machine guns; Depth charges chutes and throwers

HMAS Geelong (J201), named for the city of Geelong, Victoria, was one of 60 Bathurst-class corvettes constructed during World War II, and one of 36 initially manned and commissioned solely by the Royal Australian Navy (RAN).

Geelong was lost after a collision on 18 October 1944. She was one of only three Bathurst class corvettes lost during World War II.

== Design and construction ==
In 1938, the Australian Commonwealth Naval Board (ACNB) identified the need for a general purpose 'local defence vessel' capable of both anti-submarine and mine-warfare duties, while easy to construct and operate. The vessel was initially envisaged as having a displacement of approximately 500 tons, a speed of at least 10 knots (19 km/h; 12 mph), and a range of 2,000 nautical miles (3,700 km; 2,300 mi) The opportunity to build a prototype in the place of a cancelled Bar-class boom defence vessel saw the proposed design increased to a 680-ton vessel, with a 15.5 knots (28.7 km/h; 17.8 mph) top speed, and a range of 2,850 nautical miles (5,280 km; 3,280 mi), armed with a 4-inch gun, equipped with asdic, and able to fitted with either depth charges or minesweeping equipment depending on the planned operations: although closer in size to a sloop than a local defence vessel, the resulting increased capabilities were accepted due to advantages over British-designed mine warfare and anti-submarine vessels. Construction of the prototype HMAS Kangaroo did not go ahead, but the plans were retained. The need for locally built 'all-rounder' vessels at the start of World War II saw the "Australian Minesweepers" (designated as such to hide their anti-submarine capability, but popularly referred to as "corvettes") approved in September 1939, with 60 constructed during the course of the war: 36 (including Geelong) ordered by the RAN, 20 ordered by the British Admiralty but manned and commissioned as RAN vessels, and 4 for the Royal Indian Navy.

Geelong was laid down by HMA Naval Dockyard at Williamstown, Victoria on 16 October 1940. She was launched on 22 April 1941 by the wife of Lord Winston Dugan, then Governor of Victoria, and was commissioned into the RAN on 16 January 1942.

== Operational history ==
After commissioning, Geelong visited her namesake city before undergoing working up trials. On completion, the corvette was assigned as a minesweeper and anti-submarine patrol ship along the east coast of Australia, before being redeployed to New Caledonia on 8 March 1942 to perform similar duties. In May 1942, Geelong returned Sydney, and was one of several Allied vessels located in Sydney Harbour during the Japanese midget submarine attack of 31 May 1942. In June, the ship began convoy escort runs between Sydney and Brisbane, which continued until January 1944, when she sailed to Adelaide for a two-month refit.

After the refit, Geelong briefly operated in Australian waters before being assigned to New Guinea. Using Milne Bay as a base of operations, the corvette served as a convoy escort and anti-submarine patrol ship throughout the South West Pacific Area.

== Fate ==
On 18 October 1944, Geelong collided with the American tanker York and sank north of Langemak, New Guinea, at 6°4′S 147°45′E. There were no deaths, with the survivors picked up by York and transported to Langemak.

Geelong was one of only three Bathurst class ships to be lost during World War II, and one of two lost to collision.

The ship received two battle honours for her wartime service: "Pacific 1942–44" and "New Guinea 1944".
