= HMAS Toomaree =

History

Australia
- Name: Toomaree Correct name is Toomeree
- Builder: Lars Halvorsen and Sons
- Completed: 1937
- Fate: Unknown

History

Australia
- Name: Toomaree

General characteristics
- Armament: 1 .303 Vickers MG, 4 Depth charges

HMAS Toomaree (NOTE: her correct name is Toomeree) was formerly a luxury motor cruiser, commissioned as a channel patrol boat and operated by the Royal Australian Navy (RAN) during World War II. She was one of thirteen similar vessels, known to Sydneysiders as the 'Hollywood Fleet'.

Toomeree was built by Lars Halvorsens and Sons in 1937 for Harold Percival Christmas, one of the founders of Woolworths who already had a long association with the Halvorsens. As with other Halvorsen cruisers, Toomeree was relatively small at 55 feet (16.76m). She was designed for extended cruising and tropical service. Opening windows in the trunk cabin over the forward deck, in the wheelhouse and in the after-section of the vessel where the galley and crews quarters were located provided ample ventilation. Unlike the other cruisers, Toomeree was fitted with Gardner diesel engines. She was of the normal stout Halvorsen construction - spotted gum keel and frames and oregon planking. She included a deck saloon, a twin cabin complete with toilet facility, a two berth cabin to starboard with toilet facility, a single berth cabin to port and another two berth cabin aft also complete with a WC facility.

She was requisitioned and later commissioned by the RAN on 15 May 1942 under the command of Lieutenant J P T Hanson RANVR. Toomeree was armed with .303 Vickers machine guns fore and aft and depth charge racks on the stern.

During the Battle of Sydney Harbour (often referred to as the attack on Sydney Harbour), following the first explosions, Toomeree proceeded to the eastern end of the boom net to assist the protection of the harbour. Following the Battle, Toomeree continued regular patrol duties at Sydney, Port Kembla and Newcastle.

On 27 February 1944, Toomeree departed Sydney for Merauke on the south-west coast of New Guinea. Whilst at Merauke, she undertook air sea rescue, patrol and pilot duties. By the end of September 1945, whilst still at Merauke, she had steamed 5,798 miles (9,275 km) since she had been commissioned. On 27 September 1945, there was no further need for her at Merauke and she was ordered to be returned to Sydney for disposal.

By June 1946, she had been acquired by Tea Gardens-Nelson’s Bay Ferries as a ‘suitable craft for special trips’. She was reported in 1948 competing in the New South Wales Big Game Fishing Association’s competition off Port Stephens and Newcastle where it was proposed to release pigeons to carry news from the competition vessels whilst at sea, to the shore station at Shoal Bay, Port Stephens. She was still working in 1951 when she was reported taking visitors to the local off-shore Cabbage Tree Islands. Nothing further is known of her.
