= HMAS Yarroma =

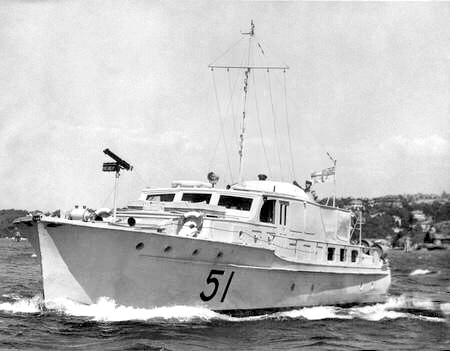
- HMAS Yarroma in Sydney, February 1944

History

Australia
- Name: Yarroma

History

Australia
- Name: Yarroma
- Honours and awards: Battle honours: Pacific 1942

General characteristics
- Type: Channel patrol boat
- Armament: 1 .303 Vickers MG, 4 Depth charges

HMAS Yarroma was formerly a luxury motor cruiser, commissioned as a channel patrol boat operated by the Royal Australian Navy (RAN) during the Second World War. She was one of thirteen similar vessels, known to Sydneysiders as the 'Hollywood Fleet'.

Yarroma was built by W L Holmes for Philip Bevan, and launched on 24 September 1939. She was 58 feet 6 inches (17.83 m) with a beam of 14 feet 9 inches (4.50 m) powered by twin eight cylinder 180 hp Gray Marine engines. She included a two berth cabin, a single berth cabin, a crews cabin, galley with gas stove and electric refrigerator, shower room, toilet, dining saloon and a deck saloon. Keel and frames were of spotted gum, New Zealand kauri planking and Queensland maple superstructure and interior woodwork.

She was formally requisitioned by the Navy on 20 June 1941, and commissioned as HMAS Yarroma on 19 August 1941, under command of Sub-Lieutenant S G Kingsford-Smith RANVR. Like HMAS Lolita, she was armed with .303 Vickers machine guns fore and aft, and fitted with twin depth charge chutes on the stern. She was also fitted with the new anti-submarine ASDIC '134' equipment.

During the Battle of Sydney Harbour, (referred to by others as the Attack on Sydney Harbour) Yarroma was at the western end of the incomplete boom net, when midget submarine M14 was caught in the net and detected. Not wanting to risk the installed ASDIC equipment, commander Eyes aboard Yarroma declined to investigate the sighting and called HMAS Lolita over from its station at the eastern end of the boom net. CWO Anderson aboard Lolita, quickly confirmed the object was a submarine and immediately attacked dropping two depth charges. Both failed to explode as they had been ordered to be set to a deeper setting than the shallow depth of the harbour. However, the Japanese crew, realizing they had been caught, self-destructed the submarine in an attempt to sink Lolita when she made her third attack. The resulting explosion resulted in the element of surprise for the attack being given up. Later during the Battle, Yarroma detected M21 in Taylors Bay, long after it had been destroyed earlier by HMAS Seamist. Yarroma together with HMAS Steady Hour dropped additional depth charges on the already stricken submarine. Together with Steady Hour, Yarroma was incorrectly given credit for the destruction of the submarine, and for her action during the Battle, she was awarded the 'Pacific 1942' Battle Honour.

There is no record in the RAN's Sydney Log of Yarroma departing the harbour after the Battle of Sydney Harbour, and it appears she may have continued her duties at Sydney throughout the remainder of the war. On 20 May 1944, Yarroma was transferred to the Naval Auxiliary Patrol (NAP). In late 1944, the vessel underwent a refit. During mid 1945, she underwent a further electrical and mechanical refit including the installation of new Hudson Invader marine engines. By June 1945 she was back patrolling the boom net before returning to the Sayonara slip for hull cleaning and repairs to the propeller shafts. She had 'steamed' a distance of 1,782 miles (2,868 km) in the twelve months since her transfer to the NAP, which indicates she conducted patrols at ports, other than just Sydney.

Yarroma was 'paid off' on 25 August 1945 and was offered back to Philip Bevan for the sum of £4,000 - the same sum he had received from the Navy three years before. His response was short and to the point – 'Not interested in purchase of vessel Yarroma'. She was advertised for sale on 9 December 1945, together with HMAS Miramar. Yarroma was sold at auction to Standard Vacuum Oil Co on 18 December 1945 for £5,250.

Like other Hollywood Fleet vessels, there is no further history.
