= Alma Doepel =

Ship built in 1903

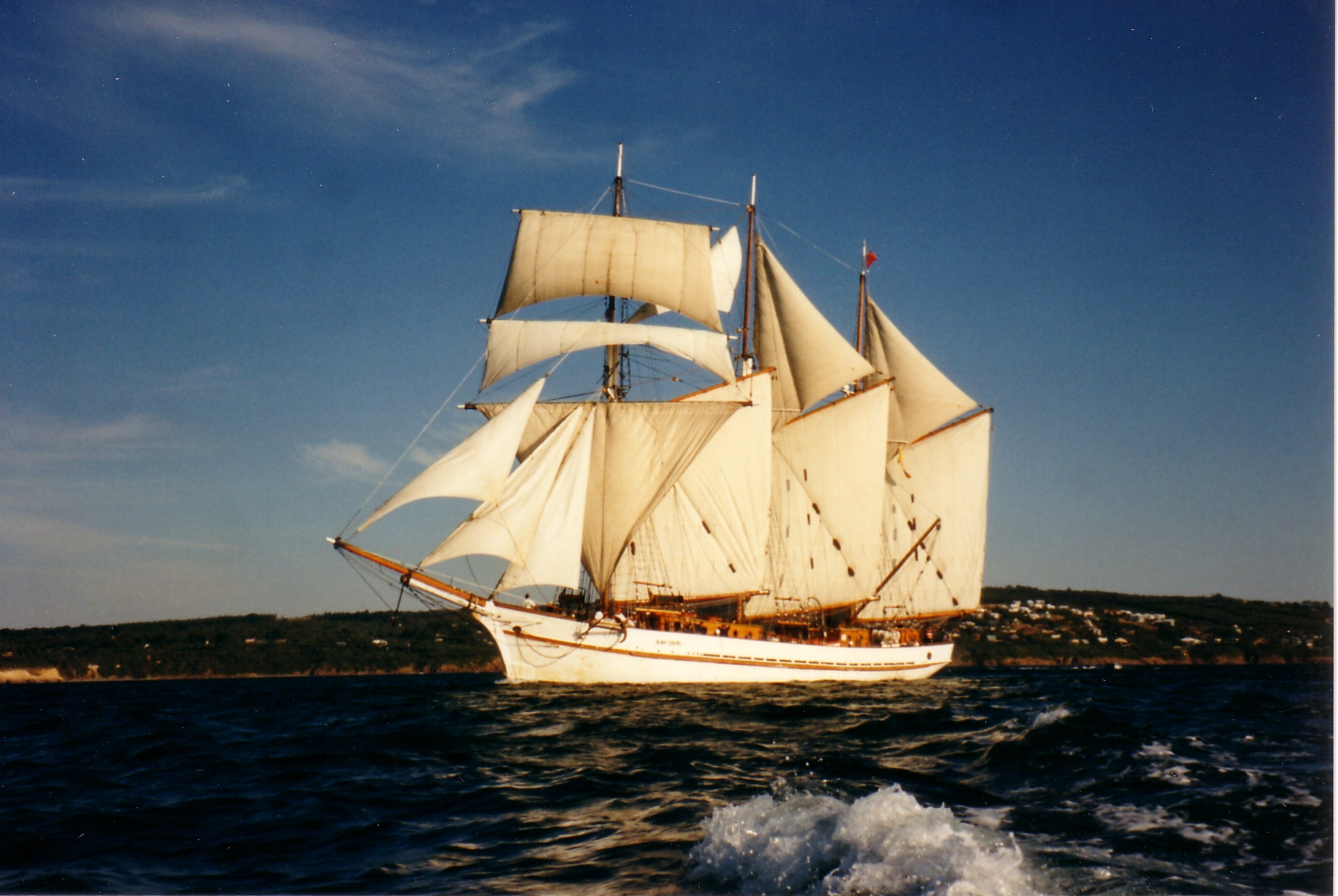
- Alma Doepel under sail off Sorrento, Victoria, Australia. Late 1980s.

History

Australia
- Name: Alma Doepel
- Owner: Sail & Adventure, Ltd.
- Port of registry: Hobart, Tasmania
- Builder: Bellingen, New South Wales
- Launched: October 10, 1903
- Identification: IMO number: 5011884
- Status: Undergoing restoration as of 2019

General characteristics
- Tonnage: 150.69 tonnes
- Displacement: 256 tons
- Length: 45.20 m (148.3 ft)
- Beam: 8 m (26 ft)
- Height: 28 m (92 ft)
- Draught: 2.2 m (7.2 ft)
- Propulsion: sail, auxiliary diesel engine, 247 hp (184 kW)
- Sail plan: Topsail Schooner, 12 sails, including triangular course on the foremast
- Capacity: 36 cadets
- Crew: 11

The Alma Doepel is a three-masted topsail schooner and is one of the oldest such ships surviving.

== Early history ==
Alma Doepel was built in 1903 in Bellingen, NSW, by Frederik Doepel and named after his youngest daughter Alma. Until 1915 she operated between Sydney and the northern rivers district of New South Wales. In late 1915 she was sold to Tasmanian owners and commenced operation in Tasmania, mainly carrying timber and goods between Hobart and Melbourne. She was fitted with an auxiliary engine in 1916, and again in 1936. In a 1937 refit her rig was simplified from having square topsails on the foremast to having a fore-and-after rig. In 1943 she was requisitioned by the army, refitted and renamed AK82, and used as an army supply vessel running from Townsville and Darwin to Papua New Guinea. After the war she was reverted to merchant vessel configuration, resuming operation in Tasmania in 1946. From 1961 to 1975 she was stripped of her rigging and used to carry limestone, before being sold, for the scrap value of her engines, to the Melbourne company Sail & Adventure in 1976.

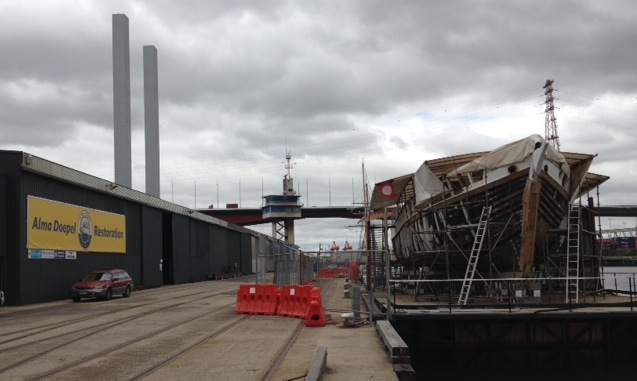
Alma Doepel on custom-made barge undergoing hull work as part of complete restoration. Docklands, Victoria, Australia.

This ship was also used in the opening credits of Quigley Down Under in 1990.

== Restoration 1970s and 80s ==
In July 1976 ownership was transferred to Sail and Adventure Ltd., a non-profit organisation formed to restore and use the ship as a sail training vessel. From 1976 to 1987, Alma Doepel was comprehensively restored. Stage one of the restoration had been completed by mid-1978. In mid-1978 the Port of Melbourne Authority provided berthing and storage facilities at North Wharf. By December 1979 a new deck had been fitted and lower masts had been stepped and rigged. During 1980 a new keel and rudder were fitted at a slipway constructed at Hastings. Sails were fitted in 1983. Limited sailing occurred by January 1984. She led the Parade of Sail in Sydney Harbour in January 1988.

== Sail Training 1980s to 1990s ==
From July 1988 she was used as a sail training ship, based in Melbourne, until 1999 when the need for work on the hull and lack of funds put a stop to this activity.

In April 2001, Alma Doepel was taken to Port Macquarie where she was berthed at Lady Nelson Wharf and open to the public as a static exhibit.

== Second Restoration 2010s and 2020s ==
In January 2009 the Alma Doepel returned to Melbourne and the second restoration began.From 2013, she was berthed at No 2 Victoria Dock (Melbourne), mounted on a submergible barge, undergoing an extensive refit to return her to survey so she can recommence sail training. On 16 October 2021 she was lifted off the barge and back into the water by the cargo ship AAL Shanghai and was ready for re-rigging and her internal fit-out.

== See also ==
- List of schooners
