= List of ships of the Royal Australian Navy =

A selection of ships that have served in the Royal Australian Navy (and period of service)

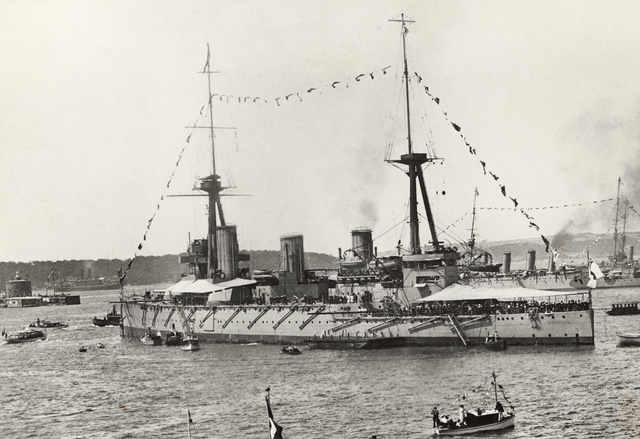
Indefatigable-class battlecruiser HMAS Australia (1913–1921)

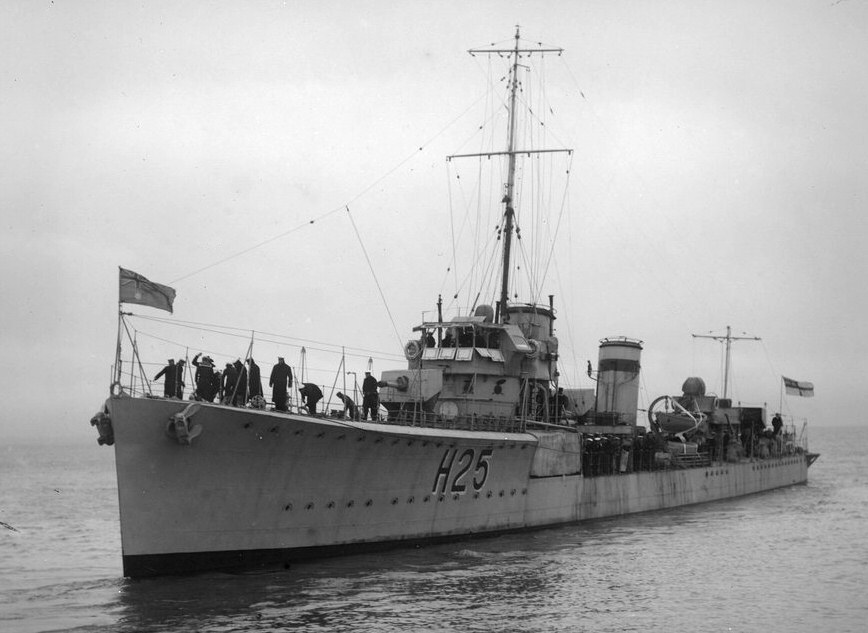
S-class destroyer HMAS Tasmania (1920–1928)

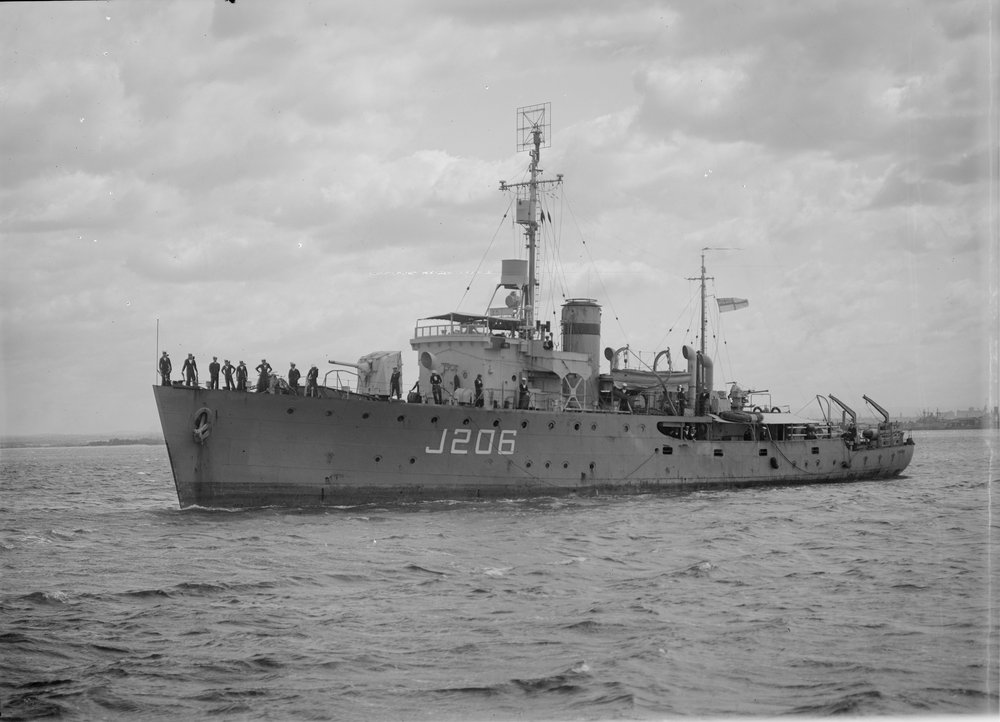
Bathurst-class corvette HMAS Lithgow (1941–1956)

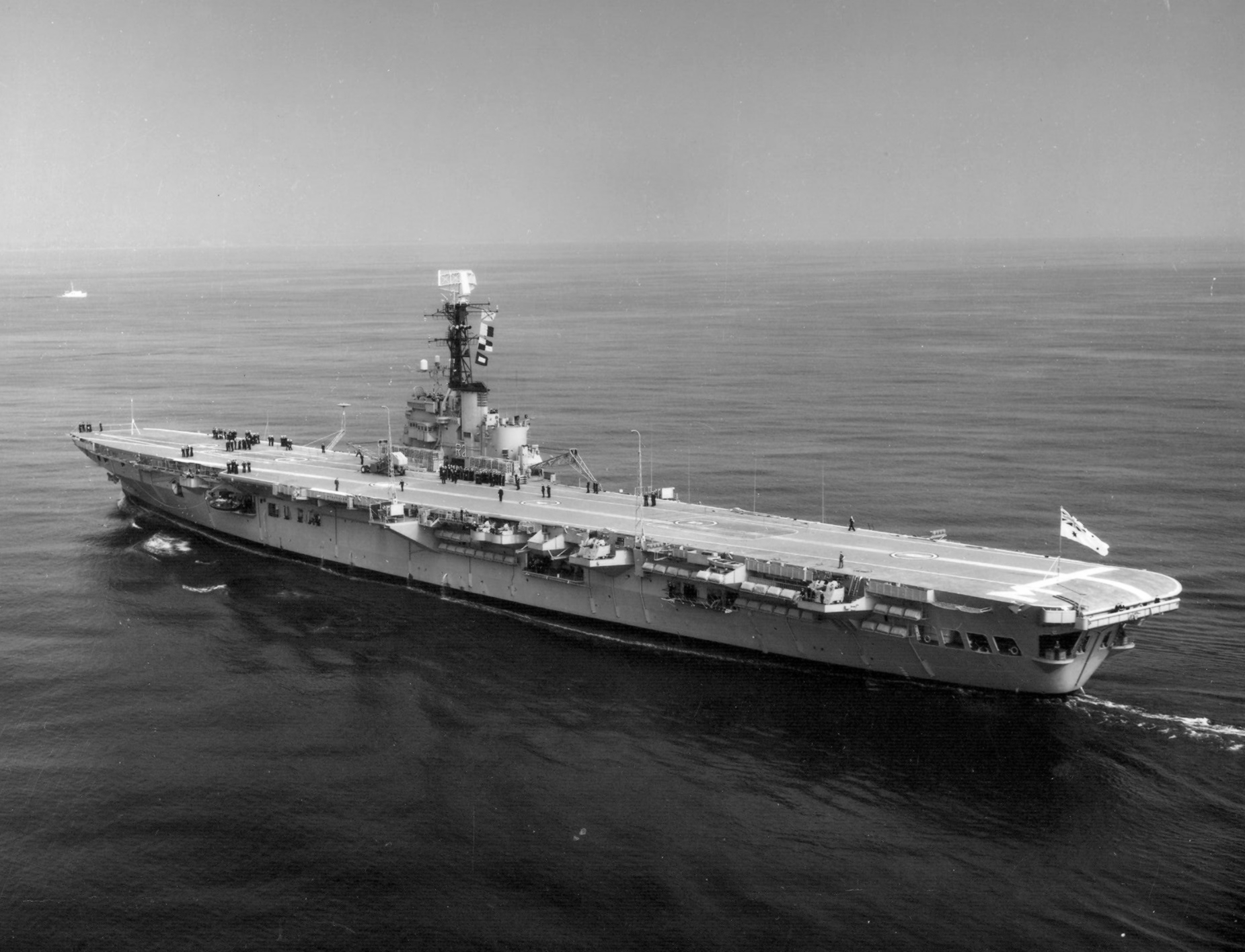
Majestic-class aircraft carrier HMAS Melbourne (1955–1982)

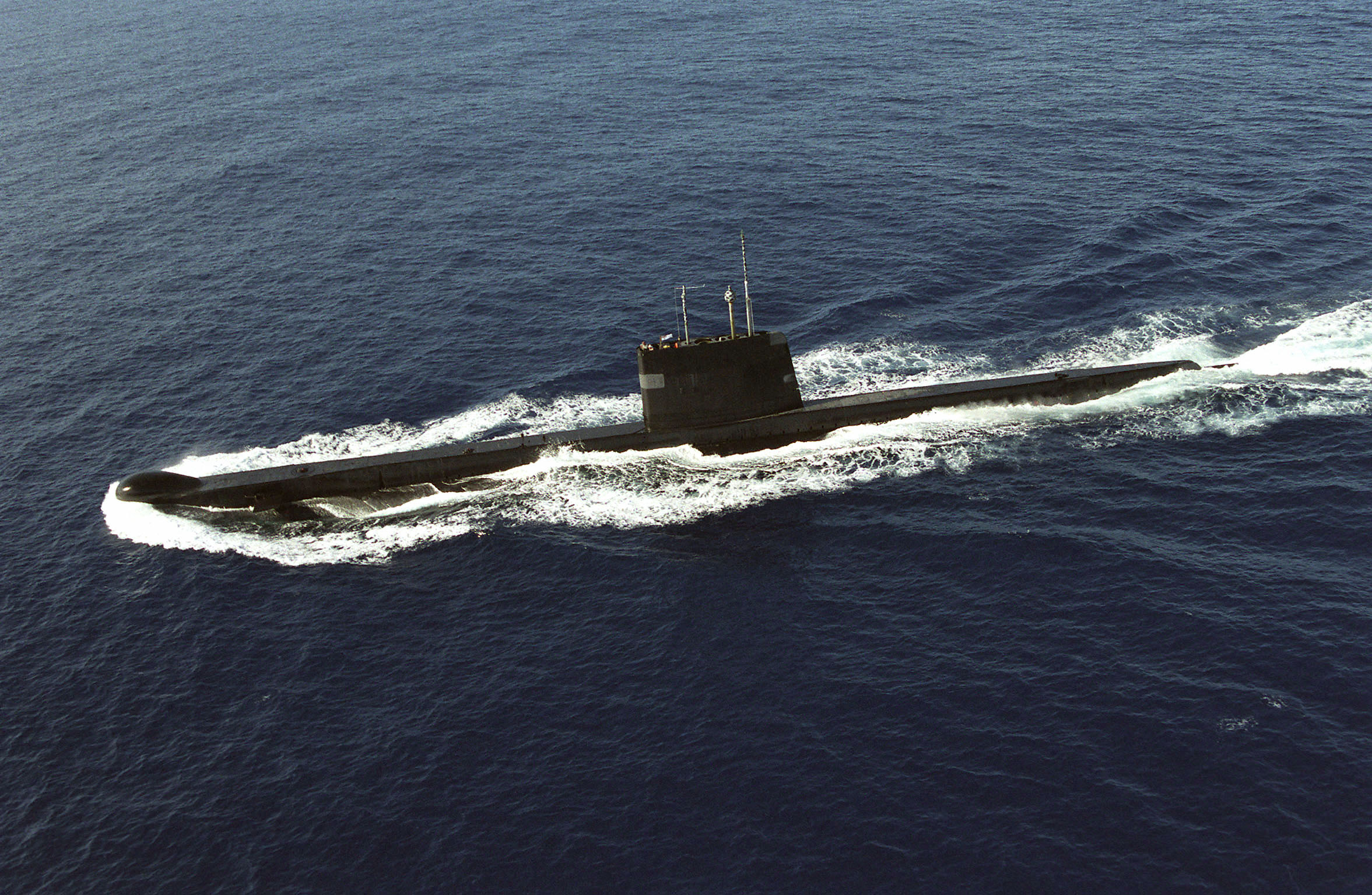
Oberon-class submarine HMAS Onslow (1969–1999)

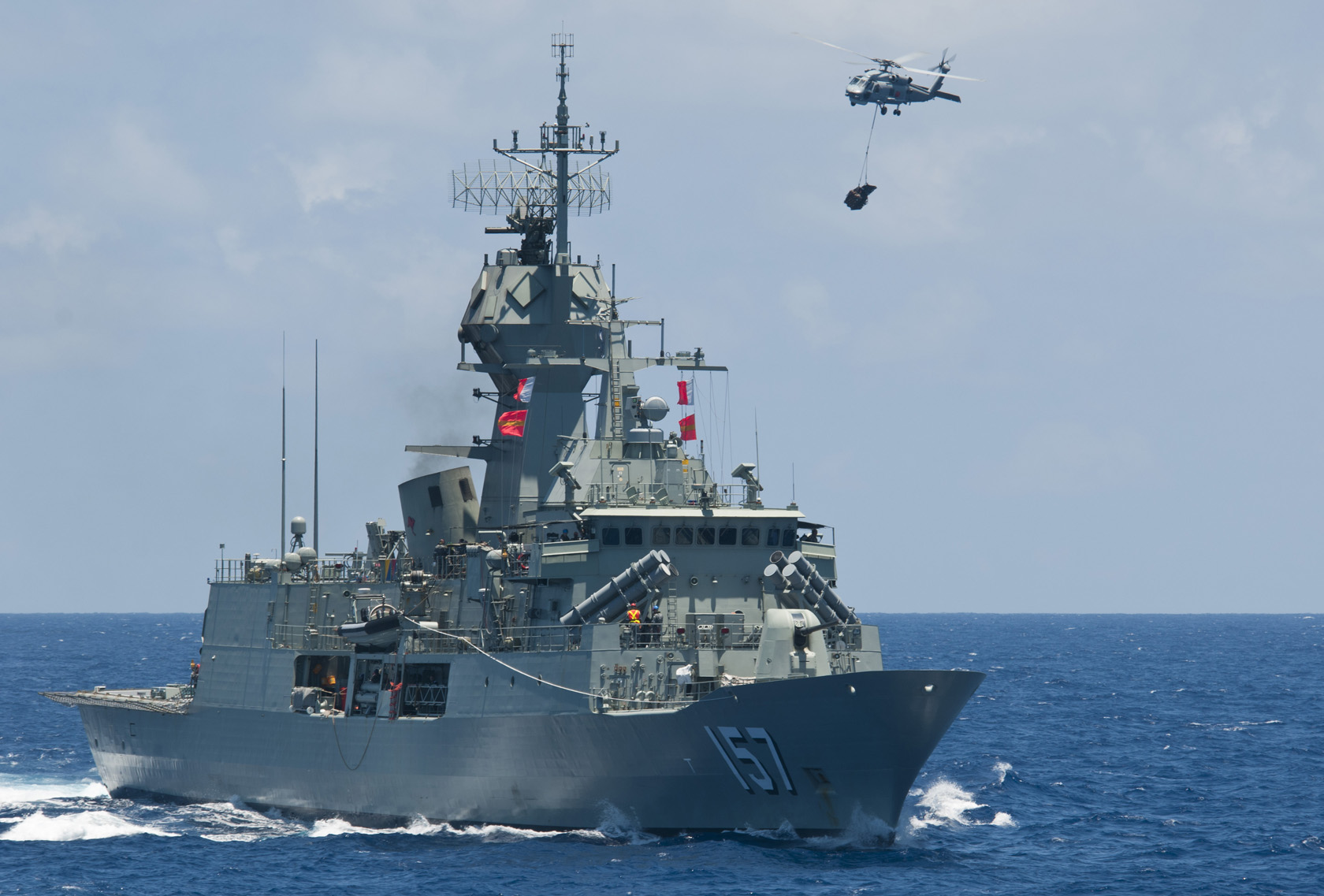
Anzac-class frigate HMAS Perth (2006–present)

Since its foundation in 1913, the Royal Australian Navy has operated a large number of vessels, including various types of warships, support and supply warships.

== Current ships ==
As of June 2025, the strength of the Royal Australian Navy consists of 34 commissioned vessels, plus 10 non-commissioned vessels.

Name	Pennant	Type	Class	Commissioned
HMAS Adelaide	L01	Landing helicopter dock	Canberra	2015
HMAS Albany	P86	Patrol boat	Armidale	2006
HMAS Arafura	OPV-203	Offshore patrol vessel	Arafura	2025
HMAS Arunta	FFH-151	Frigate	Anzac	1998
HMAS Ballarat	FFH-155	Frigate	Anzac	2004
HMAS Bathurst	P85	Patrol boat	Armidale	2006
HMAS Brisbane	DDG-41	Destroyer	Hobart	2018
HMAS Canberra	L02	Landing helicopter dock	Canberra	2014
HMAS Cape Capricorn	P317	Patrol boat	Cape	2023
HMAS Cape Naturaliste	P316	Patrol boat	Cape	2022
HMAS Cape Pillar	P319	Patrol boat	Cape	2023
HMAS Cape Schanck	P313	Patrol boat	Cape	2024
HMAS Cape Solander	P312	Patrol boat	Cape	2024
HMAS Cape Woolamai	P318	Patrol boat	Cape	2023
HMAS Childers	P93	Patrol boat	Armidale	2007
HMAS Choules	L100	Landing ship dock	Bay	2011
HMAS Collins	SSG-73	Submarine	Collins	1996
HMAS Dechaineux	SSG-76	Submarine	Collins	2001
HMAS Diamantina	M86	Minehunter	Huon	2002
HMAS Farncomb	SSG-74	Submarine	Collins	1998
HMAS Hobart	DDG-39	Destroyer	Hobart	2017
HMAS Leeuwin	A245	Survey ship	Leeuwin	2000
HMAS Parramatta	FFH-154	Frigate	Anzac	2003
HMAS Perth	FFH-157	Frigate	Anzac	2006
HMAS Rankin	SSG-78	Submarine	Collins	2003
HMAS Sheean	SSG-77	Submarine	Collins	2001
HMAS Stalwart	A304	Oiler Replenishment	Supply	2021
HMAS Stuart	FFH-153	Frigate	Anzac	2002
HMAS Supply	A195	Oiler Replenishment	Supply	2021
HMAS Sydney	DDG-42	Destroyer	Hobart	2020
HMAS Toowoomba	FFH-156	Frigate	Anzac	2005
HMAS Waller	SSG-75	Submarine	Collins	1999
HMAS Warramunga	FFH-152	Frigate	Anzac	2001
HMAS Yarra	M87	Minehunter	Huon	2003

=== Non-commissioned ships ===
Name	Pennant no.	Type	Class	In service
ADV Cape Fourcroy	P310	Patrol boat	Cape	2017
ADV Cape Inscription	P320	Patrol boat	Cape	2017
ADV Cape Otway	P314	Patrol boat	Cape	2022
ADV Cape Peron	P315	Patrol boat	Cape	2022
ADV Guidance		Auxiliary naval vessel		2023
ADV Reliant		Auxiliary naval vessel		2022
ADV Ocean Protector		Auxiliary naval vessel		2016
MV Stoker		Submarine rescue ship		2016
MV Besant		Submarine rescue ship		2015
MV Sycamore		Aviation training ship		2017
MV Mercator		Navigation training vessel		1998
STS Young Endeavour		Sail training tall ship		1988

== Past ships ==
=== A ===
Name	Type	Class	Dates	Notes
Aase Maersk	Fleet oiler	Auxiliary vessel	1942–1945	
HMAS Abraham Crijnssen	Minesweeper	Jan van Amstel	1942–1943	Transferred from Royal Netherlands Navy in August 1942, returned in May 1943
HMAS Acute	Patrol boat	Attack	1968–1983	to Indonesia
HMAS Adelaide	Light cruiser	Town	1922–1946	
HMAS Adelaide	Frigate	Adelaide	1980–2008	Scuttled off Avoca as a dive wreck in April 2011
HMAS Adele	Examination vessel		1939–1943	Formerly HMAS Franklin 1915–1922
HMAS Adroit	Patrol boat	Attack	1968–1994	
HMAS Advance	Patrol boat	Attack	1968–1988	museum ship at Australian National Maritime Museum, Sydney
HMAS AE1	Submarine	E	1914	
HMAS AE2	Submarine	E	1914–1915	
HMAS Air Bird	Air-Sea Rescue Launch	Air/Sea Search and Rescue Vessel	1945-1946	Transferred to the Royal Australian Air Force in 1949
HMAS Air Chief	Air-Sea Rescue Launch	Air/Sea Search and Rescue Vessel	1944-1966	
HMAS Air Clan	Air-Sea Rescue Launch	Air/Sea Search and Rescue Vessel	1944-1946	
HMAS Air Cloud	Air-Sea Rescue Launch	Air/Sea Search and Rescue Vessel	1944-1949	
HMAS Air Faith	Air-Sea Rescue Launch	Air/Sea Search and Rescue Vessel	1945-1946	
HMAS Air Foam	Air-Sea Rescue Launch	Air/Sea Search and Rescue Vessel	1944-1944	ex-HMAS Air Wave
HMAS Air Guide	Air-Sea Rescue Launch	Air/Sea Search and Rescue Vessel	1944-1946	ex-HMAS Air Hope (913)
HMAS Air Hope	Air-Sea Rescue Launch	Air/Sea Search and Rescue Vessel	1945-1946	
HMAS Air Host	Air-Sea Rescue Launch	Air/Sea Search and Rescue Vessel	1944-1946	renamed HMAS Air Guide
HMAS Air Master	Air-Sea Rescue Launch	Air/Sea Search and Rescue Vessel	1944-1968	
HMAS Air Mercy	Air-Sea Rescue Launch	Air/Sea Search and Rescue Vessel	1945-1957	
HMAS Air Mist	Air-Sea Rescue Launch	Air/Sea Search and Rescue Vessel	1944-1945	
HMAS Air Nymph	Air-Sea Rescue Launch	Air/Sea Search and Rescue Vessel	1949–1962	ex-HMAS Air Save
HMAS Air Rest	Air-Sea Rescue Launch	Air/Sea Search and Rescue Vessel	1944-1949	Transferred to the Royal Australian Air Force in 1950
HMAS Air Sailor	Air-Sea Rescue Launch	Air/Sea Search and Rescue Vessel	1944-1946	
HMAS Air Save	Air-Sea Rescue Launch	Air/Sea Search and Rescue Vessel	1949–1962	renamed HMAS Air Nymph
HMAS Air Sense	Air-Sea Rescue Launch	Air/Sea Search and Rescue Vessel	1945-1946	
HMAS Air Spray	Air-Sea Rescue Launch	Air/Sea Search and Rescue Vessel	1945-1946	
HMAS Air Sprite	Air-Sea Rescue Launch	Air/Sea Search and Rescue Vessel	1960–1976	sunk as target
HMAS Air Trail	Air-Sea Rescue Launch	Air/Sea Search and Rescue Vessel	1945-1968	
HMAS Air View	Air-Sea Rescue Launch	Air/Sea Search and Rescue Vessel	1944-1946	
HMAS Air Watch	Air-Sea Rescue Launch	Air/Sea Search and Rescue Vessel	1944-1946	
HMAS Air Wave	Air-Sea Rescue Launch	Air/Sea Search and Rescue Vessel	1944-1944	renamed HMAS Air Foam
HMAS Aitape	Patrol boat	Attack	1967–1975	to Papua New Guinea
Ajax	Examination vessel		1874-1928	Returned to New South Wales Government
HMAS Alatna	Fast Supply/sea Ambulance Launch		1944-1946	
Alacrity	Patrol vessel/minesweeper	Auxiliary vessel	1917–1925	
HMAS Albatross	Seaplane tender		1929–1933	to Royal Navy
HMAS Alert				
HMAS Alfie Cam	Minesweeper	Auxiliary vessel	1940-1946	
HMAS Allenwood	Minesweeper		1941-1944	
Alvina	Examination vessel	Auxiliary vessel	1914-1918	to the Launceston Company of the Australian Sea Cadet Corps
HMAS Amohine	Auxiliary Schooner	Auxiliary vessel	1943-1945	Returned to owners
HMAS Anaconda	Stores Carrier		1944-1945	Sold in 1946
HMAS Anchorite				
HMAS Anzac	Destroyer	Parker	1920–1935	from Royal Navy
HMAS Anzac	Destroyer	Battle	1951–1974	Sold for breaking in 1975
HMAS Anzac	Frigate	Anzac	1996-2024	
Aorangi	Supply ship	Auxiliary vessel	1914–1915	
HMAS Ararat	Corvette	Bathurst	1943–1961	
HMAS Ararat	Patrol boat	Armidale	2006-2022	
HMAS Archer	Patrol boat	Attack	1968–1973	to Indonesia
HMAS Ardent	Patrol boat	Attack	1968–1984	
HMAS Armidale	Corvette	Bathurst	1942–1942	
HMAS Armidale	Patrol boat	Armidale	2005-2023	
HMAS Arrow	Patrol boat	Attack	1968–1974	wrecked by Cyclone Tracy
HMAS Arunta	Destroyer	Tribal	1942–1968	
HMAS Assail	Patrol boat	Attack	1968–1985	to Indonesia
HMAS Attack	Patrol boat	Attack	1967–1985	to Indonesia
HMAS Australia	Battlecruiser	Indefatigable	1913–1921	
HMAS Australia	Heavy cruiser	County	1928–1954	
HMAS Avalon			1942-1945	
HMAS Avonita			1942-1945	
HMAS Aware	Patrol boat	Attack	1968–1993	Scrapped in 2011

=== B ===
Name	Type	Class	Dates	Notes
HMAS Balikpapan	Landing craft	Balikpapan	1974–2012	
HMAS Ballarat	Corvette	Bathurst	1941–1947	
MSA Bandicoot	Minesweeper	Bandicoot	1991-2010s	
HMAS Bandolier	Patrol boat	Attack	1968–1973	to Indonesia
HMAS Banks	General purpose vessel	Explorer	1960–1995	Charter vessel MV Banks
HMAS Baralaba	Stores carrier	Auxiliary vessel	1942–1943	Returned to owner
HMAS Barbette	Patrol boat	Attack	1968–1985	to Indonesia
HMAS Barcoo	Frigate	River	1944–1963	
Barcoo	Coal hulk	Auxiliary vessel	1914–1924	Scuttled off Sydney in 1924.
HMAS Barricade	Patrol boat	Attack	1968–1982	to Indonesia
HMAS Barwon	Frigate	River	1945–1962	
HMAS Bass	General purpose vessel	Explorer	1960–1994	
HMAS Bataan	Destroyer	Tribal	1945–1958	
HMAS Bathurst	Corvette	Bathurst	1940–1948	
HMAS Bayonet	Patrol boat	Attack	1969–1988	
HMAS Benalla	Corvette	Bathurst	1943–1958	
HMAS Benalla	Survey launch	Paluma	1990-2023	
HMAS Bendigo	Corvette	Bathurst	1941–1947	
HMAS Bendigo	Patrol boat	Fremantle	1983–2006	
HMAS Bermagui	Auxiliary minesweeper		1939–1946	
MSA Bermagui	Auxiliary minesweeper		1994–2000	
HMAS Berrima	Armed merchant ship		1914–1917	
HMAS Beryl II	Auxiliary minesweeper		1939–1945	
HMAS Betano	Landing craft	Balikpapan	1974–2012	
HMAS Biloela	Collier		1920–1927	
HMAS Bingera	Auxiliary anti-submarine vessel	Auxiliary vessel	1940–1946	Returned to owner
HMAS Birchgrove Park	Auxiliary minesweeper			
Bishopdale	Fleet oiler	Dale	1942–1945	On loan from Royal Navy
HMAS Black Snake		Snake	1944–1945	Transferred to British Borneo Civil Administration Unit in 1945
HMAS Bombard	Patrol boat	Attack	1968–1983	to Indonesia
HMAS Bombo	Auxiliary minesweeper		1940-1946;	Returned to civilian service
HMAS Bonthorpe	Auxiliary minesweeper		1939–1945	
HMAS Boonaroo	Cargo ship		1967–1967	Charter vessel MV Boonaroo
Boronia	Crane stores lighter	Wattle	1972–1997	sold to Defence Maritime Services
HMAS Bowen	Corvette	Bathurst	1942–1956	
HMAS Brisbane	Light cruiser	Town	1916–1929	
HMAS Brisbane	Destroyer	Charles F. Adams	1967–2001	
Brolga	Auxiliary minesweeper	Auxiliary vessel	1917–1919	Returned to owners
MSA Brolga	Auxiliary minesweeper		1988–2002	
HMAS Bronzewing	Tug			
HMAS Broome	Corvette	Bathurst	1942–1946	to Turkey
HMAS Broome	Patrol boat	Armidale	2007-2024	
HMAS Brunei	Landing craft	Balikpapan	1971–2014	to the Philippines
HMAS Buccaneer	Patrol boat	Attack	1969–1985	to Indonesia
HMAS Buna	Landing craft	Balikpapan	1973–1974	to Papua New Guinea
HMAS Bunbury	Corvette	Bathurst	1942–1961	
HMAS Bunbury	Patrol boat	Fremantle	1984–2005	
HMAS Bundaberg	Corvette	Bathurst	1942–1961	
HMAS Bundaberg	Patrol boat	Armidale	2007–2014	Scrapped due to extensive fire damage
HMAS Bungaree	Auxiliary minelayer		1940–1946	
HMAS Burdekin	Frigate	River	1944–1946	
HMAS Burnie	Corvette	Bathurst	1941–1946	to Netherlands
HMAS Burra Bra	Training ship		1943-1947	

=== C ===
Name	Type	Class	Dates	Notes
HMAS Cairns	Corvette	Bathurst	1942–1946	to Netherlands
Caledonian Salvor	Ocean salvage tug		1942-1958	
Cambrian Salvor	Ocean salvage tug		1942-1958	
HMAS Canberra	Heavy cruiser	County	1928–1942	Sunk at Battle of Savo Island
HMAS Canberra	Frigate	Adelaide	1981–2005	
HMAS Cape Leeuwin	Lighthouse tender		1943–1945	
Captain Cook	Examination vessel			
Captain Cook II	Examination vessel			
Captain Cook III	Examination vessel			
HMAS Carroo	Lighter		1942–1946	
MSA Carole-S	Auxiliary minesweeper		1993–1994	
HMAS Castlemaine	Corvette	Bathurst	1942–1945	museum ship at Williamstown
HMAS Cerberus	Monitor		1911–1921	from colonial navy of Victoria. Hulk partially submerged Port Philip Bay
HMAS Cessnock	Corvette	Bathurst	1942–1947	
HMAS Cessnock	Patrol boat	Fremantle	1983–2005	
HMVS Childers	Torpedo boat		1911–1918	from colonial navy of Victoria
HMAS Colac	Corvette	Bathurst	1942–1983	
HMAS Condamine	Frigate	River	1945–1962	
HMAS Coogee	Armed patrol vessel/minesweeper	Auxiliary vessel	1918–1919	
HMAS Cook	Survey ship		1980–1990	
HMAS Coolebar	Auxiliary minesweeper		1939-1945	
HMAS Coombar	Auxiliary minesweeper			
HMAS Cootamundra	Corvette	Bathurst	1943–1962	
HMAS Countess of Hopetoun	Torpedo boat		1911–1924	from colonial navy of Victoria
HMAS Cowra	Corvette	Bathurst	1943–1961	
HMAS Culgoa	Frigate	River	1945–1962	
HMAS Curlew	Minesweeper	Ton	1962–1991	ex-HMS Chediston

=== D ===
Name	Type	Class	Dates	Notes
HMAS Darwin	Frigate	Adelaide	1984-2017	
HMAS Deloraine	Corvette	Bathurst	1941–1956	
HMAS Derwent	Destroyer escort	River	1964–1994	
HMAS Diamantina	Frigate	River	1945–1981	museum ship at Queensland Maritime Museum
HMAS Diamond Snake			1945-1945	
HMAS Doomba	Auxiliary minesweeper and anti-submarine vessel	Hunt	1939–1946	
HMAS Dubbo	Corvette	Bathurst	1942–1958	
HMAS Dubbo	Patrol boat	Fremantle	1984–2006	
HMAS Duchess	Destroyer	Daring	1964–1977	from Royal Navy
HMAS Durraween	Auxiliary minesweeper		1940-1945	

=== E ===
Name	Type	Class	Dates	Notes
HMAS Echuca	Corvette	Bathurst	1942–1952	to New Zealand
HMAS Eduardo			1945	from Royal Navy, returned to Royal Navy
HMAS Elwing	Tug	Auxiliary vessel	1942–??	
HMAS Encounter	Protected cruiser	Challenger	1912–1923	from Royal Navy. Renamed HMAS Penguin in 1923
HMAS Emu	Tug		1946-1959	
Esturia	Oiler and stores ship/destroyer depot ship	Auxiliary vessel	1914–1917	

=== F ===
Name	Type	Class	Dates	Notes
HMAS Falie	Inspection/stores vessel		1940–1946	Interned motor ketch, demasted for service
Falkefjell	Fleet oiler	Auxiliary vessel	1941–1942	On loan from Royal Navy
HMAS Fantome	Sloop	Cadmus	1914–1925	from Royal Navy
HMAS Flinders	Survey ship		1973–1998	
HMAS Flying Cloud			1943	
HMAS Forceful	Tugboat		1942–1943	museum ship at Queensland Maritime Museum
HMAS Franklin	Tender		1915–1922	Later served as HMAS Adele 1939–1943
HMAS Fremantle	Corvette	Bathurst	1943–1961	
HMAS Fremantle	Patrol boat	Fremantle	1980–2006	

=== G ===
Name	Type	Class	Dates	Notes
HMAS Gascoyne	Frigate	River	1946-1966	
HMAS Gawler	Corvette	Bathurst	1942–1946	to Turkey
HMAS Gawler	Patrol boat	Fremantle	1983–2006	
HMAS Gayundah	Gunboat		1911–1921	from Queensland Maritime Defence Force, colonial navy of Queensland. Hulk beached at Redcliffe
HMAS Gayundah	Motor refrigeration lighter	MRL	1944–1981	Built by Johnson's Tyne Foundry in Melbourne in 1944–45, re-commissioned in 1966.
HMAS Geelong	Corvette	Bathurst	1942–1944	
HMAS Geelong	Patrol boat	Fremantle	1984–2006	
HMAS Geraldton	Corvette	Bathurst	1942–1946	to Turkey
HMAS Geraldton	Patrol boat	Fremantle	1983–2006	
HMAS Geranium	Corvette	Arabis	1919–1927	ex HMS Geranium from Royal Navy, scuttled off Sydney on 16 April 1935.
HMAS Gladstone	Corvette	Bathurst	1943–1956	
HMAS Gladstone	Patrol boat	Fremantle	1984–2007	
HMAS Glenelg	Corvette	Bathurst	1942–1957	
HMAS Glenelg	Patrol boat	Armidale	2008–2022	
HMAS Goolgwai	Auxiliary minesweeper		1939-1945	
HMAS Goonambee	Auxiliary minesweeper		1940-1944	
HMAS Goorangai	Auxiliary minesweeper		1939–1940	Sunk following collision with HMAT Duntroon
HMAS Gordon	Torpedo boat		1911–1914	ex-HMVS Gordon from colonial navy of Victoria
HMAS Goulburn	Corvette	Bathurst	1941–1947	
HMAS Grantala	Hospital ship		1914-1915	
HMAS Gull	Minesweeper	Ton	1962–1976	ex-HMS Swanston
HMAS Gumleaf		Auxiliary vessel	1943	
HMAS Gunbar	Auxiliary minesweeper		1940–1946	
Gunundaal	Auxiliary minesweeper	Auxiliary vessel	1917–1919	Returned to owner
MSA Gunundaal	Auxiliary minesweeper	Auxiliary vessel	1989-1992	
HMAS Gympie	Corvette	Bathurst	1942–1961	

=== H ===
Name	Type	Class	Dates	Notes
HMAS Hankow	Coal hulk		1913–1932	sunk as target by HMAS Albatross.
HMAS Hawk	Auxiliary patrol boat		1940–1945	Ex-HMAS Sleuth.
HMAS Hawk	Minesweeper	Ton	1962–1976	ex-HMS Somerleyton
HMAS Hawkesbury	Frigate	River	1944–1955	
HMAS Hawkesbury	Minehunter Coastal	Huon	2000-2018	
HMAS HDML 1074	Harbour defence motor launch		1942–1948	ex Royal Navy
HMAS HDML 1125	Harbour defence motor launch		1943-1944	
HMAS HDML 1129	Harbour defence motor launch		1942–1947	ex Royal Navy
HMAS HDML 1161	Harbour defence motor launch		1943–1947	ex Royal Navy
HMAS HDML 1321	Harbour defence motor launch		1943-1971	served with Allied Intelligence Bureau
HMAS HDML 1322	Harbour defence motor launch		1944-1952	Wrecked on North Head, Sydney
HMAS HDML 1323	Harbour defence motor launch		1944-1950	Gifted to Philippines
HMAS HDML 1324	Harbour defence motor launch		1944-1982	
HMAS HDML 1325	Harbour defence motor launch		1943 1988	
HMAS HDML 1326	Harbour defence motor launch		1944-1950	Gifted to Philippines
HMAS HDML 1327	Harbour defence motor launch		1944-1958	served with Allied Intelligence Bureau
HMAS HDML 1328	Harbour defence motor launch		1945-2950	Gifted to Philippines
HMAS HDML 1329	Harbour defence motor launch		1945–1946	Gifted to Philippines
HMAS HDML 1343	Harbour defence motor launch			served with Far East Liaison Officer
HMAS HDML 1344	Harbour defence motor launch		1945-1945	Placed in reserve after construction
HMAS HDML 1345	Harbour defence motor launch		1945-1945	Placed in reserve after construction
HMAS HDML 1347	Harbour defence motor launch		1945–1946	
HMAS HDML 1359	Harbour defence motor launch			served with Far East Liaison Officer
HMAS Heros	Auxiliary anti-submarine vessel and tugboat	Rescue/Saint	1940–1942, 1943–1947	
HMAS Hobart	Light cruiser	Leander	1938–1947	ex-HMS Apollo
HMAS Hobart	Destroyer	Charles F. Adams	1965–2000	Sunk as dive wreck
HMAS Horsham	Corvette	Bathurst	1942–1961	
HMAS Huon	Torpedo boat destroyer	River	1915–1928	
HMAS Huon	Minehunter	Huon	1999-2024	

=== I ===
Name	Type	Class	Dates	Notes
HMAS Ibis				Requisitioned during World War II
HMAS Ibis	Minesweeper	Ton	1962–1984	ex-HMS Singleton
HMAS Inverell	Corvette	Bathurst	1942–1952	to New Zealand
HMAS Ipswich	Corvette	Bathurst	1942–1946	to Royal Netherlands Navy
HMAS Ipswich	Patrol boat	Fremantle	1982–2007	

=== J ===
Name	Type	Class	Dates	Notes
HMAS J1	Submarine	J	1919–1924	from Royal Navy
HMAS J2	Submarine	J	1919–1924	from Royal Navy
HMAS J3	Submarine	J	1919–1926	from Royal Navy
HMAS J4	Submarine	J	1919–1924	from Royal Navy
HMAS J5	Submarine	J	1919–1924	from Royal Navy
HMAS J7	Submarine	J	1919–1929	from Royal Navy
HMAS Jeparit	Bulk carrier		1969–1971	from and returned to Australian National Line
HMAS Jervis Bay	Training ship		1977–1996	
HMAS Jervis Bay	Troop transport		1999–2001	
HMAS John Oxley	Examination vessel	Auxiliary vessel	1943–194?	Returned to owners
HMAS Junee	Corvette	Bathurst	1944–1958	

=== K ===
Name	Type	Class	Dates	Notes
HMAS K9	Submarine	K VIII	1943–1944	From the Netherlands
HMAS Kalgoorlie	Corvette	Bathurst	1942–1946	
HMAS Kangaroo	Boom defence vessel	Bar	1940–1955	
HMAS Kanimbla	Landing ship		1943–1949	from and to Royal Navy
HMAS Kanimbla	Landing ship	Kanimbla	1994–2011	from US Navy, ex-USS Saginaw
HMAS Kapunda	Corvette	Bathurst	1942–1961	
HMAS Kara Kara	Auxiliary boom defense vessel	Auxiliary vessel	1941–1972	Sold for scrap in 1972, hulk sunk as target off Jervis Bay in 1973
HMAS Karangi	Boom defense vessel	Bar	1941-1957	
HMAS Katoomba	Corvette	Bathurst	1940–1957	
Kelat	Coal hulk	Auxiliary vessel	1941–1942	Sunk after air raid in Darwin
HMAS Kianga	Auxiliary minesweeper		1941-1946	
HMAS Kiama	Corvette	Bathurst	1942–1952	to New Zealand
HMAS Kimbla	Trials ship		1956–1985	
HMAS Kinchela	Net layer		1942-1946	
HMAS King Bay	Examination vessel		1940–1946	
HMAS Koala	Boom defense vessel	Bar	1940-1969	
HMAS Kookaburra	Boom defence vessel	Net	1939–1958	
HMAS Koolonga	Collier and supply ship	Auxiliary vessel	1914–1915	
HMAS Koompartoo	Auxiliary boom defence vessel	Auxiliary vessel	1942-1962	
HMAS Koopa	Training depot ship and Fairmile Motor Launch depot ship	Auxiliary vessel	1942–1947	returned to owners in 1947
HMAS Kooronga	Tug/Training ship	Auxiliary vessel	1924–1948	sold to private owners and converted into a schooner
HMAS Korowa	Auxiliary minesweeper		1939-1945	
Koraaga	Auxiliary minesweeper	Auxiliary vessel	1917–1918	Returned to owner
MSA Koraaga	Auxiliary minesweeper		1989–2000	
HMAS Kuramia	Auxiliary netlayer		1942-1945	
HMAS Kuru	Patrol boat		1941–1943	From Northern Territory Patrol Service
HMAS Kurumba	Oiler		1919–1947	from Royal Navy
HMAS Kuttabul	Accommodation ship	Auxiliary vessel	1940–1942	sunk on 31 May 1942 in Sydney Harbour
HMAS Kweena	Auxiliary Patrol boat/tender vessel		1943-1944	returned to civilian service
HMAS Kybra	Auxiliary anti-submarine vessel	Auxiliary vessel	1940-1945	

=== L ===
Name	Type	Class	Dates	Notes
HMAS Labuan	Landing ship	LST(3)	1946–1955	from Royal Navy
HMAS Labuan	Landing craft	Balikpapan	1973–2014	
HMAS Lachlan	Frigate	River	1945–1949	to New Zealand
HMAS Ladava	Patrol boat	Attack	1968–1975	to Papua New Guinea
HMAS Lae	Landing ship	LST(3)	1946–1955	from Royal Navy
HMAS Lae	Patrol boat	Attack	1968–1975	to Papua New Guinea
HMAS Latrobe	Corvette	Bathurst	1942–1956	
HMAS Launceston	Corvette	Bathurst	1942–1946	to Turkey
HMAS Launceston	Patrol boat	Fremantle	1982–2006	
HMAS Launceston	Patrol boat	Armidale	2007–2023	
HMAS Larrakia	Patrol boat	Armidale	2006–2023	
HMAS Leilani	Channel patrol boat/Pilot vessel	Auxiliary vessel	1941–1945	
HMAS Limicola	Anti-submarine indicator loop repair ship			
HMAS Lismore	Corvette	Bathurst	1941–1946	to Netherlands
HMAS Lithgow	Corvette	Bathurst	1941–1956	
HMAS Lolita	Channel patrol boat		1941–1945	
HMAS Lonsdale	Torpedo boat		1901–1912	from colonial navy of Victoria
HMAS LST 3008	Landing ship	LST(3)	1946–1950	from Royal Navy
HMAS LST 3014	Landing ship	LST(3)	1946–1950	from Royal Navy
HMAS LST 3022	Landing ship	LST(3)	1946–1950	from Royal Navy

=== M ===
Name	Type	Class	Dates	Notes
HMAS Macquarie	Frigate	River	1945–1962	
HMAS Madang	Patrol boat	Attack	1968–1975	to Papua New Guinea
HMAS Maitland	Patrol boat	Armidale	2006-2022	
HMAS Mallina	Store carrier and collier	Auxiliary vessel	1914–1915	
HMAS Mallow	Corvette	Acacia	1919–1925	from Royal Navy
Mamutu		Auxiliary vessel	1941-1941	
HMAS Manoora	Armed merchant ship		1939–1947	
HMAS Manoora	Landing ship	Kanimbla	1994–2011	From US Navy, ex-USS Fairfax County
HMAS Marguerite	Sloop	Arabis	1919–1929	ex-HMS Marguerite from Royal Navy, scuttled off Sydney on 1 August 1935.
HMAS Marlean	Channel patrol boats	Converted civilian pleasure boat	1941-1944	
HMAS Maroubra	Cutter	Converted civilian cutter	1942–1943	Sunk in a Japanese air raid on Milingimbi, NT
HMAS Marrawah	Auxiliary minesweeper		1941-1943	
HMAS Maryborough	Corvette	Bathurst	1941–1947	
HMAS Maryborough	Patrol boat	Armidale	2007-2023	
HMAS Mary Cam	Auxiliary minesweeper		1939-1945	
HMAS Matafele	Stores carrier	Auxiliary vessel	1943–1944	ex-Burns Philp & Company cargo and passenger vessel, lost without trace with all hands in June 1944.
HMAS Mavie	Patrol boat	Converted lugger	1941–1942	Sunk Darwin, 1942.
HMAS Medea	Minesweeper		1942–1945	ex-HMS Circe, scuttled off Sydney on 20 January 1948.
HMAS Melbourne	Light cruiser	Town	1913–1928	
HMAS Melbourne	Aircraft carrier	Majestic	1955–1982	ex-HMS Majestic
HMAS Melbourne	Frigate	Adelaide	1992-2019	
HMAS Melville	Survey ship	Leeuwin	2000-2024	
HMAS Mercedes	Minesweeper		1942–1945	ex-HMS Medusa, scuttled off Sydney on 23 January 1948.
Merkur	Victualling Store Issue Supply Ship	Auxiliary vessel	1942–1949	returned to her owners Burns Philp & Company.
HMAS Mermaid	Survey launch	Paluma	1989-2021	
HMAS Midge	Torpedo boat		1911–1912	from Queensland Maritime Defence Force
HMAS Mildura	Corvette	Bathurst	1941–1956	
HMAS ML 827		Fairmile B motor launch	1943–1944	Capsized and sank while under tow on 20 November 1944 off Cape Kawai, New Britain.
HMAS Mollymawk	Tug		1946-1957	
HMAS Mombah	Stores ship		1923–1930; 1940–1948	
HMAS Moresby	Survey ship/Sloop	24	1925–1946	from Royal Navy
HMAS Moresby	Survey ship	Moresby	1964–1997	
HMAS Mother Snake			1945-1945	
HMAS Murchison	Frigate	River	1945–1962	
Murex	Oiler	Auxiliary vessel	1914-1916	

=== N ===
Name	Type	Class	Dates	Notes
HMAS Nambucca	Auxiliary minesweeper	Auxiliary vessel	1940–1943	transferred to United States Navy
HMAS Napier	Destroyer	N	1940–1945	returned to the Royal Navy
HMAS Narani	Auxiliary minesweeper	Auxiliary vessel	1941–1946	returned to her owners
HMAS Nereus	Channel patrol boat	Requisitioned civilian vessel	1941-1942	destroyed by fire on 2 July 1942
HMAS Nepal	Destroyer	N	1942–1945	returned to the Royal Navy
HMAS Nepean	Torpedo boat	Second-class torpedo boat	1901–1912	scuttled off Swan Island, Port Phillip in 1912
HMAS Nestor	Destroyer	N	1941–1942	scuttled off Crete on 16 June 1942, following damage from bombing
HMAS Newcastle	Frigate	Adelaide	1993–2019	Decommissioned on 30 June 2019
HMAS Nizam	Destroyer	N	1941–1945	returned to the Royal Navy
HMAS Norman	Destroyer	N	1941–1945	returned to the Royal Navy
HMAS Norman	Minehuner	Huon	2000-2018	

=== O ===
Name	Type	Class	Dates	Notes
ADV Ocean Shield	Humanitarian and disaster relief vessel		2012-2014	Transferred to Customs
OFL No. 1	Oil fuel lighter	500-ton Oil Fuel Lighter	1916-1942	
OFL No. 2	Oil fuel lighter	500-ton Oil Fuel Lighter	1916-??	
OFL No. 3	Oil fuel lighter	500-ton Oil Fuel Lighter	1915-??	
OFL No. 4	Oil fuel lighter	500-ton Oil Fuel Lighter	1915-??	
OFL 1201 (Rocklea)	Oil fuel lighter	1200-ton Oil Fuel Lighter		
OFL 1202	Oil fuel lighter	1200-ton Oil Fuel Lighter		
OFL 1203	Oil fuel lighter	1200-ton Oil Fuel Lighter		
OFL 1204	Oil fuel lighter	1200-ton Oil Fuel Lighter		
OFL 1205	Oil fuel lighter	1200-ton Oil Fuel Lighter		
OFL 1206	Oil fuel lighter	1200-ton Oil Fuel Lighter	1945-1964	
OFL 1207	Oil fuel lighter	1200-ton Oil Fuel Lighter		
OFL 1208 (Karpoint)	Oil fuel lighter	1200-ton Oil Fuel Lighter		
HMAS Olive Cam	Auxiliary minesweeper		1939-1945	
HMAS Onslow	Submarine	Oberon	1969–1999	museum ship Australian National Maritime Museum
HMAS Orara	Auxiliary minesweeper		1939-1945	
HMAS Orion	Submarine	Oberon	1977–1997	
HMAS Otama	Submarine	Oberon	1978–1999	museum ship at Western Port, VIC
Otter	Examination vessel	Auxiliary vessel	(1914–1918) & (1939–1940)	returned to owner
HMAS Otway	Submarine	Odin	1927–1937	to Royal Navy
HMAS Otway	Submarine	Oberon	1968–1994	
HMAS Ovens	Submarine	Oberon	1969–1995	
HMAS Oxley	Submarine	Odin	1927–1937	to Royal Navy
HMAS Oxley	Submarine	Oberon	1967–1992	

=== P ===
Name	Type	Class	Dates	Notes
HMAS Paluma	Gunboat		1911–1916	from Queensland Maritime Defence Force
HMAS Paluma	Auxiliary patrol vessel		1941–1945	Motor Boat
HMAS Paluma	Survey vessel	Unnamed class of 18 MSLs	1946–1973	Converted from Motor Store Lighter No 252 (MSL 252)
HMAS Paluma	Survey launch	Paluma	1989-2021	
HMAS Parkes	Corvette	Bathurst	1944–1957	
HMAS Parramatta	Torpedo boat destroyer	River	1910–1928	
HMAS Parramatta	Sloop	Grimsby	1940–1941	
HMAS Parramatta	Destroyer escort	River	1961–1991	
HMAS Patricia Cam	Auxiliary minesweeper		1942–1943	Converted from a commercial trawler
HMAS Paterson	Auxiliary minesweeper		1941-1945	
HMAS Penguin	Depot ship	Osprey	1913–1923	from Royal Navy
HMAS Penguin	Depot ship	Challenger	1923–1929	ex-HMAS Encounter, scuttled off Sydney on 14 September 1932.
HMAS Penguin	Depot ship		1929–1941	ex-HMAS Platypus (1917)
HMAS Perth	Light cruiser	Leander	1939–1942	ex-HMS Amphion
HMAS Perth	Destroyer	Charles F. Adams	1965–1999	diving wreck
HMAS Peter Pan	Tender		1942–1945	Attached to the Naval Auxiliary Patrol.
HMAS Phillip	Depot tender		1916–1921	ex-HMAS Togo, sold to commercial interests.
HMAS Pioneer	Light cruiser	Pelorus	1915–1916	ex HMS Pioneer from Royal Navy, scuttled off Sydney on 18 February 1931.
HMAS Ping Wo	Repair ship/Stores ship	Auxiliary vessel	1942–1946	Returned to owners in 1946
HMAS Pirie	Corvette	Bathurst	1942–1946	to Turkey
HMAS Pirie	Patrol boat	Armidale	2006-2021	
HMAS Platypus	Submarine tender		1917–1958	
HMAS Polaris	Surveying tender		1942–1945	returned to owners
HMAS Porpoise	Diving tender	Modified Ham	1973–1989	ex-HMS Neasham
HMAS Potrero		Auxiliary vessel		
HMAS Poyang	Stores ship	Auxiliary vessel	1942–1946	Returned to owners in 1946
HMAS Protector	Light cruiser		1911–1924	from colonial navy of South Australia
HMAS Protector	Trials ship		1990–1998	
HMAS Psyche	Light cruiser	Pelorus	1915–1918	from Royal Navy

=== Q ===
Name	Type	Class	Dates	Notes
HMAS Quadrant	Destroyer	Q	1945–1963	ex-HMS Quadrant from Royal Navy, sold in 1963 for breaking up
HMAS Quality	Destroyer	Q	1945–1958	ex-HMS Quality from Royal Navy, sold in 1958 for breaking up
HMAS Queenborough	Destroyer	Q	1945–1975	ex-HMS Queenborough from Royal Navy, sold in 1975 for breaking up
HMAS Quiberon	Destroyer	Q	1942–1972	from Royal Navy, sold in 1972 for breaking up
HMAS Quickmatch	Destroyer	Q	1942–1972	from Royal Navy, sold in 1972 for breaking up
DT Quokka	Tugboat		1984–1998	sold to Defence Maritime Services in 1998

=== R ===
Name	Type	Class	Dates	Notes
ASRV Remora	Submarine rescue vehicle	Remora	1995–2006	inactive since an accident in 2006
HMAS Reserve	Tugboat	Salvage tug	1943–1961	ex-USS BAT-11, sold in 1961
HMAS River Snake	Junk	Snake	1945-1945	transferred in 1945 to the British Civil Administration Unit, Borneo
HMAS Rockhampton	Corvette	Bathurst	1942–1961	sold in 1961 for breaking up
Rona	Coal hulk	Auxiliary vessel	1943–1946	returned to owners
HMAS Rushcutter	Minehunter	Bay	1986–2001	sold in 2002

=== S ===
Name	Type	Class	Dates	Notes
HMAS Salamaua	Landing craft	Balikpapan	1973–1974	to Papua New Guinea
HMAS Samarai	Patrol boat	Attack	1968–1975	to Papua New Guinea
HMAS Samuel Benbow	Auxiliary minesweeper	Auxiliary vessel	1940–1946	returned to owners
HMAS Sea Mist	Channel patrol boat	Requisitioned civilian vessel	1942–c1945	returned to owners
HMAS Sea Snake		Snake	1945-1945	transferred to the British Borneo Civil Administration Unit
HMAS Seal	Diving tender	Modified Ham	1968–1988	ex-HMS Wintringham
HMAS Shepparton	Corvette	Bathurst	1943–1958	
HMAS Shepparton	Survey launch	Paluma	1990-2023	
HMAS Shoalhaven	Frigate	River	1945–1962	
HMAS Shoalwater	Minehunter	Bay	1987–2001	
HMAS Shropshire	Heavy cruiser	County	1943–1949	from Royal Navy
HMAS Siesta	Channel patrol boat	Requisitioned civilian vessel	?-1942	destroyed in explosion in 1942
HMAS Silver Cloud	Channel patrol boat	Requisitioned civilian vessel	?-1943	burnt to the waterline in 1943
HMAS Sirius	Supply ship	Modified commercial tanker	2006-2021	
HMAS Sirocco	Channel patrol boat	Requisitioned civilian vessel	?-1942	burnt to the waterline in 1942
HMAS Sleuth	Patrol vessel		1917–1920, 1990	
HMAS Sleuth	Auxiliary patrol boat		1940–1945	ex-HMAS Vigilant, renamed HMAS Hawk in 1945.
HMAS Snipe	Minesweeper	Ton	1962–1983	ex-HMS Alcaston
HMAS Southern Cross	Examination vesses		1941–??	
HMAS Sprightly	Tug		1944-1958	ex USS BAT-12
HMAS Stalwart	Destroyer	S	1920–1925	scuttled off Sydney on 21 July 1939.
HMAS Stalwart	Destroyer tender		1966–1989	
HMAS Stawell	Corvette	Bathurst	1943–1952	New Zealand
HMAS Steady Hour	Channel patrol boat	Requisitioned civilian vessel	1941–1945	burnt to the waterline in 1945
HMAS Stella	Survey vessel	Requisitioned civilian vessel	1942–1945	recommissioned in 1952 as HMAS Warreen
HMAS Strahan	Corvette	Bathurst	1944–1961	
HMAS Stuart	Destroyer	Scott	1933–1946	from Royal Navy
HMAS Stuart	Destroyer escort	River	1963–1991	
HMAS St Giles	Auxiliary patrol vessel/tug boat	Auxiliary vessel	1940–1942, 1945–1946	returned to owners in 1947
HMAS Success	Destroyer	S	1920–1930	
HMAS Success	Supply ship	Durance	1986-2019	
HMAS Supply	Oiler	Tide	1962–1985	
HMAS Suva	Special service vessel		1919-1919	ex HMS Suva.
HMAS Swan	Destroyer	River-class torpedo-boat destroyer	1916–1928	
HMAS Swan	Sloop	Grimsby	1937–1964	
HMAS Swan	Destroyer escort	River-class destroyer escort	1970–1996	diving wreck
HMAS Swordsman	Destroyer	S	1920–1929	
HMAS Sydney	Light cruiser	Town	1913–1928	
HMAS Sydney	Light cruiser	Leander	1935–1941	ex-HMS Phaeton
HMAS Sydney	Aircraft carrier/troopship	Majestic	1948–1973	ex-HMS Terrible
HMAS Sydney	Frigate	Adelaide	1983-2015	

=== T ===
Name	Type	Class	Dates	Notes
TRV Tailor	Torpedo recovery vessel		1971–1988	sold to Defence Maritime Services
HMAS Taipan			1945-1947	transferred to Council for Scientific and Industrial Research
HMAS Tambar	Minesweeper		1942-1946	
DT Tammar	Coastal tug		1984–1998	sold to Defence Maritime Services
HMAS Tamworth	Corvette	Bathurst	1942–1946	to Royal Netherlands Navy
HMAS Tarakan	Landing ship	LST(3)	1946–1954	from Royal Navy
HMAS Tarakan	Landing craft	Balikpapan	1973–2014	to the Philippines
HMAS Tasmania	Destroyer	S	1920–1928	
HMAS Tattoo	Destroyer	S	1920–1933	
TB 191	Torpedo boat		1911–1918	from colonial navy of South Australia
HMAS Teal	Minesweeper	Ton	1962–1979	ex-HMS Jackton
Telopea	Crane stores lighter	Wattle	1972–1997	sold to Defence Maritime Services
HMAS Terka	Minesweeper		1940–1945	
HMAS Tiger Snake	Snake		1944–1945	transferred to the British Borneo Civil Administration Unit
HMAS Tingira	Training ship		1911–1927	
HMAS Tobruk	Destroyer	Battle	1950–1972	
HMAS Tobruk	Landing ship	Modified Round Table	1981–2015	
HMAS Tolga	Minesweeper		1940-1946	
HMAS Togo	Depot tender		1916–1921	renamed HMAS Phillip
HMAS Tongkol	Minesweeper		1939-1944	
HMAS Toorie	Minesweeper		1941-1943	
HMAS Toowoomba	Corvette	Bathurst	1941–1946	to Netherlands
HMAS Toomaree	Channel patrol boat		1942–1946	
HMAS Torrens	Destroyer	River-class torpedo-boat destroyer	1916–1926	
HMAS Torrens	Destroyer escort	River	1971–1998	
HMAS Townsville	Corvette	Bathurst	1941–1956	
HMAS Townsville	Patrol boat	Fremantle	1981–2007	Museum ship at Maritime Museum of Townsville
TRV Trevally	Torpedo recovery vessel		197?–1988	sold to Defence Maritime Services
TRV Tuna	Torpedo recovery vessel		197?–1988	sold to Defence Maritime Services

=== U ===
Name	Type	Class	Dates	Notes
HMAS Una	Sloop		1914–1925	captured German yacht Komet
HMAS Uki	Auxiliary mine sweeper		1939–1943	
HMAS Uralba	Auxiliary minefield tender, boom defence vessel and armament stores carrier		1942–1945	
HMAS Upolu	Submarine depot ship		1914-1914	

=== V ===
Name	Type	Class	Dates	Notes
HMAS Vampire	Destroyer	V	1933–1942	from Royal Navy
HMAS Vampire	Destroyer	Daring	1959–1985	museum ship at Australian National Maritime Museum
HMAS Vendetta	Destroyer	V	1933–1945	from Royal Navy
HMAS Vendetta	Destroyer	Daring	1958–1979	
HMAS Vengeance	Aircraft carrier	Colossus	1952–1955	loaned from Royal Navy; returned to Royal Navy.
HMAS Vigilant	Auxiliary patrol boat		1940–1945	Renamed HMAS Sleuth in 1944.
HMAS Voyager	Destroyer	V	1933–1942	from Royal Navy
HMAS Voyager	Destroyer	Daring	1957–1964	Sunk in the Melbourne-Voyager incident

=== W ===
Name	Type	Class	Dates	Notes
HMAS Wagga	Corvette	Bathurst	1942–1962	
Wallaby	Water/Fuel Lighter	Wallaby	1983–1997	Transferred to DMS Maritime
HMAS Wallaroo	Corvette	Bathurst	1942–1943	
MSA Wallaroo	Minesweeper	Bandicoot	1991-2010s	
HMAS Waree	Tugboat	Auxiliary vessel	1942–1946	Sank on 17 October 1946
HMAS Warramunga	Destroyer	Tribal	1942–1963	
HMAS Warrawee	Auxiliary minesweeper		1941-1946	
HMAS Warrego	Torpedo boat destroyer	River	1912–1928	
HMAS Warrego	Sloop	Grimsby	1940–1963	
Warrigal	Water/Fuel Lighter	Wallaby	1984–1997	Transferred to DMS Maritime
HMAS Warrnambool	Corvette	Bathurst	1941–1947	Sank after collision with mine
HMAS Warrnambool	Patrol boat	Fremantle	1981–2005	
HMAS Wato	Tug		1941–1945	
Wattle	Tug		1934–1971	
Wattle	Crane stores lighter	Wattle	1972–1997	sold to Defence Maritime Services
HMAS Waterhen	Destroyer	V	1933–1941	from Royal Navy
HMAS Westralia	Armed merchant ship		1939–1949	
HMAS Westralia	Underway replenishment ship	Leaf	1989–2006	from Royal Navy; ex-RFA Appleleaf
HMAS Wewak	Landing craft	Balikpapan	1973–2012	
Whangape	Oiler/supply ship	Auxiliary vessel	1914	
HMAS Whang Pu	Mobile repair ship/Stores ship	Auxiliary vessel	1944–1946	
HMAS Whyalla	Corvette	Bathurst	1942–1947	Museum ship in Whyalla, South Australia
HMAS Whyalla	Patrol boat	Fremantle	1982–2005	
HMAS Wilcannia		Auxiliary vessel	1940–1947	
HMAS Wollongong	Corvette	Bathurst	1941–1946	to Royal Netherlands Navy
HMAS Wollongong	Patrol boat	Fremantle	1981–2005	
HMAS Wollongong	Patrol boat	Armidale	2007-2022	
Wombat	Water/Fuel Lighter	Wallaby	1983–1997	Transferred to DMS Maritime
HMAS Wongala	Armoured auxiliary/Guard ship		1939–1944	recommissioned in 1947 as HMAS Wyatt Earp
HMAS Woomera	Armament store carrier		1946–1960	Sank following an accidental explosion
HMAS Wyatt Earp	Converted trawler		1947–1951	Returned to commercial service
HMAS Wyrallah	Auxiliary patrol vessel		1940–1947	Renamed to HMAS Wilcannia
Wyulda	Water/Fuel Lighter	Wallaby	1984–1997	Transferred to DMS Maritime

=== Y ===
Name	Type	Class	Dates	Notes
Yampi Lass	Stores lighter	Auxiliary vessel	194?–1943	Sunk during a storm at Darwin on 11 April 1943
HMAS Yandra	Patrol craft/minesweeper	Auxiliary vessel	1940–1946	Returned to owners
HMAS Yarra	Torpedo boat destroyer	River	1910–1919	Sunk as a target off Sydney Heads in 1931
HMAS Yarra	Sloop	Grimsby	1936–1942	Sunk on 4 March 1942
HMAS Yarra	Destroyer escort	River	1961–1985	Sold and broken up
HMAS Yarroma	Channel patrol boat		1941-1945	
HMAS Yunnan	Ammunition stores issuing ship	Auxiliary vessel	1944–1946	Returned to her owners

== See also ==
- Amphibious warfare ships of Australia
