= Gunundaal =

Two ships of the Royal Australian Navy have been named Gunundaal.

- ST Gunundaal, a fishing vessel acquired as an auxiliary minesweeper in 1917 and returned to owners in 1918
- MSA Gunundaal, a fishing vessel acquired as an auxiliary minesweeper in 1992 and stricken later that year
