= HMAS Wilcannia =

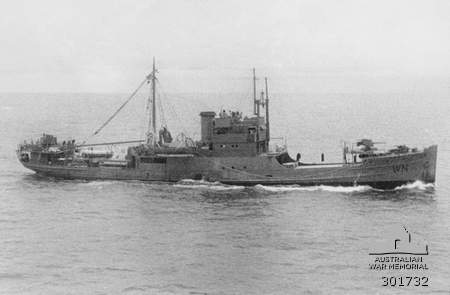
- HMAS Wilcannia in February 1943

History
- Name: Wyrallah (1934–1942) (1947–1960); Colorado del Mar (1960–1964) (?? – 1972); Tamata (1964–??); Union Pacific (1972–1973); Ocean Life (1973–1976); Sri Mahkota (1976–1979); Sinar Surya (1979–??)
- Operator: North Coast Steam Navigation Company (1934–1942) (1946–1960); John Burke & Company (1960–1964)
- Builder: Burmeister & Wain, Copenhagen
- Launched: 1934
- Fate: Broken up in 2004

Australia
- Name: Wyrallah (1940–1942); Wilcannia (1942–1947)
- Commissioned: 2 September 1940
- Renamed: February 1942
- Honours and awards: Battle honours: Darwin 1942-43; Pacific 1942-44; New Guinea 1943
- Fate: Returned to owners in 1947

General characteristics
- Type: Anti-submarine vessel, patrol vessel
- Tonnage: 1,049 tonnes
- Length: 216.4 feet (66.0 m)
- Beam: 36.7 feet (11.2 m)
- Draught: 8.3 feet (2.5 m)
- Armament: 1 × 4-inch gun (bow); 1 × 2-pounder gun (stern); 3 × Vickers .303 machine guns

HMAS Wilcannia (FYP2, WN) was a 1,049-ton anti-submarine and patrol vessel of the Royal Australian Navy (RAN).

Wyrallah was built in 1934 by Burmeister & Wain, Copenhagen as a cargo passenger motor vessel for the North Coast Steam Navigation Company.

She plied the Richmond River to Sydney run. At the start of World War II, Wyrallah was requisitioned and was commissioned into the RAN as an anti-submarine vessel on 2 September 1940. Wyrallah was part of the search for survivors of HMAS Sydney November 1941, off the West Australian coast.

In February 1942, her name was changed to HMAS Wilcannia, to avoid confusion with the new Bathurst-class corvette, HMAS Whyalla. During the later part of her service with the RAN, she was in New Guinea waters. HMAS Fremantle collided with Wilcannia on 27 July 1944. Wilcannia earned three battle honours for her wartime service, "Darwin 1942-43", "Pacific 1942-44" and "New Guinea 1943".

Wyrallah was returned to owners in 1947. She was sold in 1954 to John Burke & Company, Brisbane, later sold in 1960 and renamed Colorado del Mar. Changing owners again in 1964 and renamed Tamata, briefly before changing ownership and renamed Colorado del Mar. Sold in 1972 and renamed Union Pacific, before being renamed Ocean Life in 1973, Sri Mahkota in 1976, Sinar Surya in 1979.

== Fate ==
She was broken up at Chittagong, Bangladesh in March 2004.
