= HMAS Polaris =

History

Australia
- Name: Southern Cross Stars
- Builder: W.L. Holmes and Co. Sydney
- Laid down: 1939
- Launched: 1940

History

Australia
- Name: HMAS Polaris (FY 63)
- Honours and awards: Battle honours: New Guinea 1942–43

General characteristics
- Displacement: 49 tons
- Length: 63 feet (19 m)
- Beam: 18.5 feet (5.6 m)
- Draught: 10.5 feet (3.2 m)
- Speed: 12 knts

HMAS Polaris was a trawler requisitioned by the Royal Australian Navy in 1942 as a survey tender.

== Construction ==
Designed by Harry DeWall, Head Shipwright at W.L. Holmes & Co. Boatyard.

It was built at their McMahon's Point Boatyard in Sydney, Australia.

In 1939, the Keel was laid and had a construction cost £5750.

== Service ==
Polaris was commissioned in November 1942 as a surveying tender and joined the small survey task force in Papua New Guinea in company with HMA Ships Whyalla and Stella. Their first job was to survey the sea route from Milne Bay to Oro Bay, Papua and they came under attack from Japanese bombers off Cape Nelson on 2 January 1943. Polaris was paid off on 5 November 1945 and returned to her owners.

Polaris was awarded the battle honour "New Guinea 1942–43".

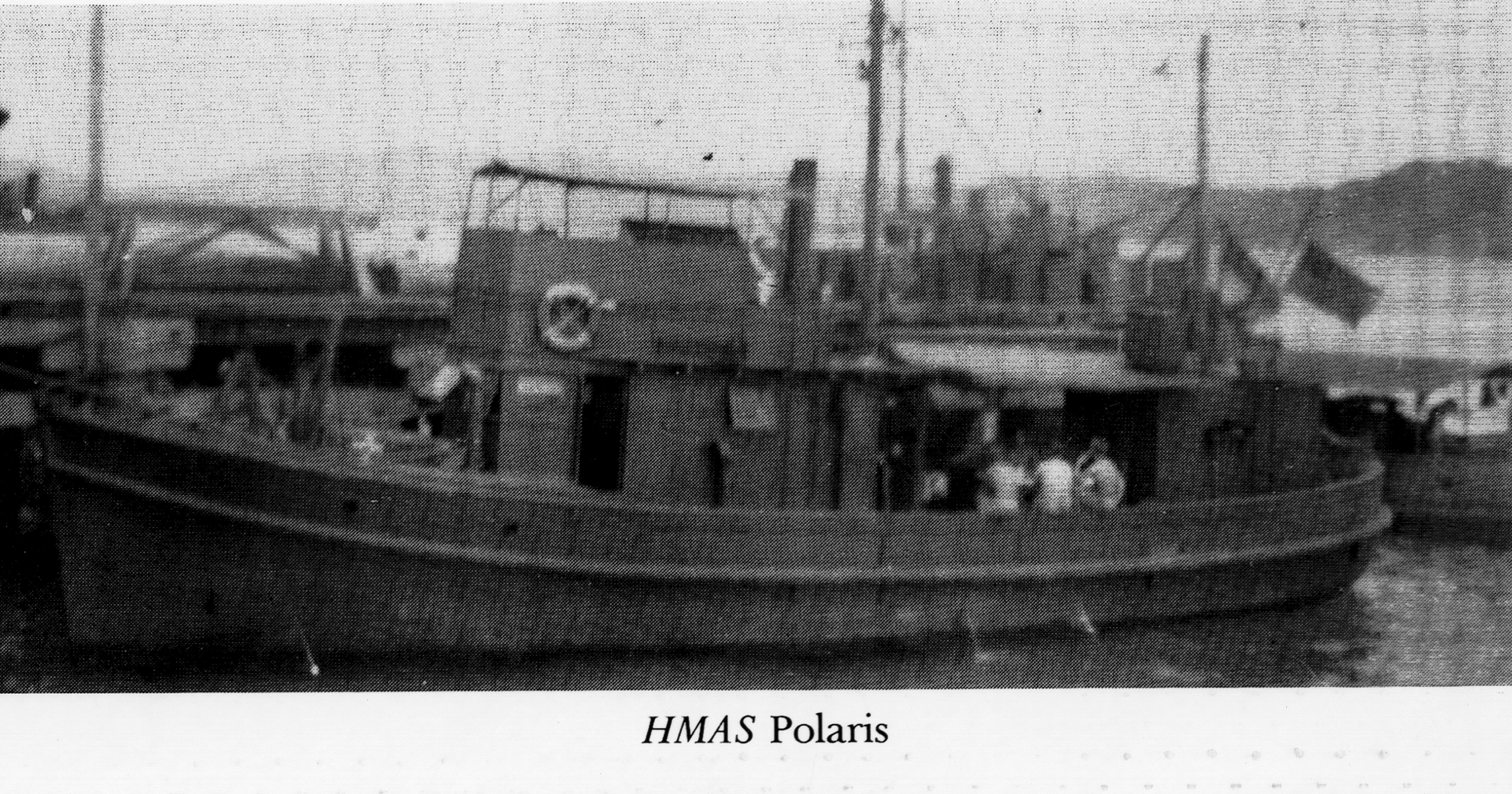
HMAS Polaris in service in Papua New Guinea
