= HMAS Marlean =

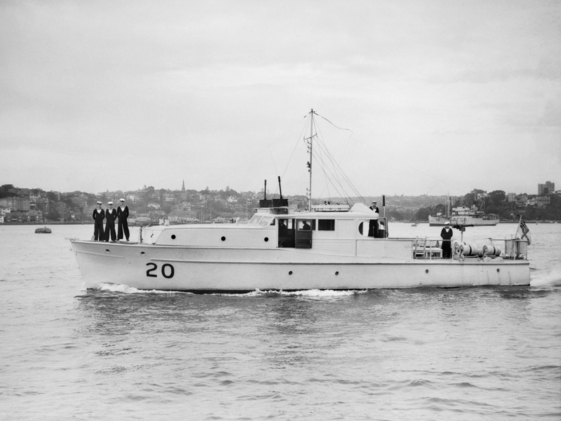
- HMAS Marlean on Sydney Harbour; HMAS Yandra is in the background

History

Australia
- Name: Marlean
- Builder: J. Williams & Sons, Bayview
- Laid down: 1938
- Launched: 1939
- Fate: Destroyed by fire 12 November 1944

History

Australia
- Name: HMAS Marlean
- Honours and awards: Battle honours: Darwin 1942
- Fate: Destroyed by fire and explosion in 1944

HMAS Marlean (Q20) was a channel patrol boat commissioned into and operated by the Royal Australian Navy (RAN) during World War II. She was one of thirteen similar vessels, known to Sydney siders as the 'Hollywood Fleet'.

Prior to the War, she was a private vessel built by J. Williams & Sons laid down in 1938 and launched in 1939. she was 59 feet (18 m) in length which had been increased by 10 feet to 69 feet (21 m). Her beam was 14 feet 6 inches (4.42 m). Keel and frames were of spotted gum with huon pine planking. She was powered by two six cylinder Gray marine engines each of 105 hp. She was arranged to sleep eight persons in three double and two single berth cabins and included a deck saloon, dining saloon, toilet, shower room, and an annex galley at the aft end of the dining salon which included a built in refrigerator.

She was requisitioned and later commissioned by the RAN on 30 November 1941. Marlean was armed with .303 Vickers machine guns fore and aft and depth charge racks on the stern.

During the Battle of Sydney Harbour on 31 May and 1 June 1942, following the first explosions, Marlean proceeded to the western end of the boom net to assist the protection of the harbour. Following the Battle of Sydney Harbour (often referred to as the attack on Sydney Harbour), HMAS Marlean continued patrol duties at Sydney, Port Kembla, and Newcastle.

On 14 April 1944, the command of Marlean was transferred to the Naval Auxiliary Patrol (NAP) unit of the RAN.

Marlean was awarded a Battle Honour for her wartime service, "Darwin 1942", yet there is no record of her arriving at Darwin or serving in Darwin. It appears the transfer did not occur, because on 27 April 1942, just twelve weeks after the first Japanese bombing raid on Darwin, it is documented that Marlean (together with Steady Hour) returned to Sydney Harbour from patrol duties at Port Kembla and all three vessels – Marlean, Nereus and Winbah, were at anchor in Sydney Harbour on 31 May 1942.

== Fate ==
Marlean was consumed by fire and the explosion of a depth charge at Obelisk Bay, Sydney Harbour on 12 November 1944.
