= HMAS Sirocco =

History

Australia
- Name: Sirocco

History

Australia
- Name: Sirocco
- Fate: Burnt to the waterline in 1942

HMAS Sirocco (Q21) was a channel patrol boat operated by the Naval Auxiliary Patrol of the Royal Australian Navy (RAN) during World War II.

Sirocco was destroyed by fire and burnt to the waterline at Hobart on 26 January 1942.
