= HMAS Tasmania =

Australian destroyer

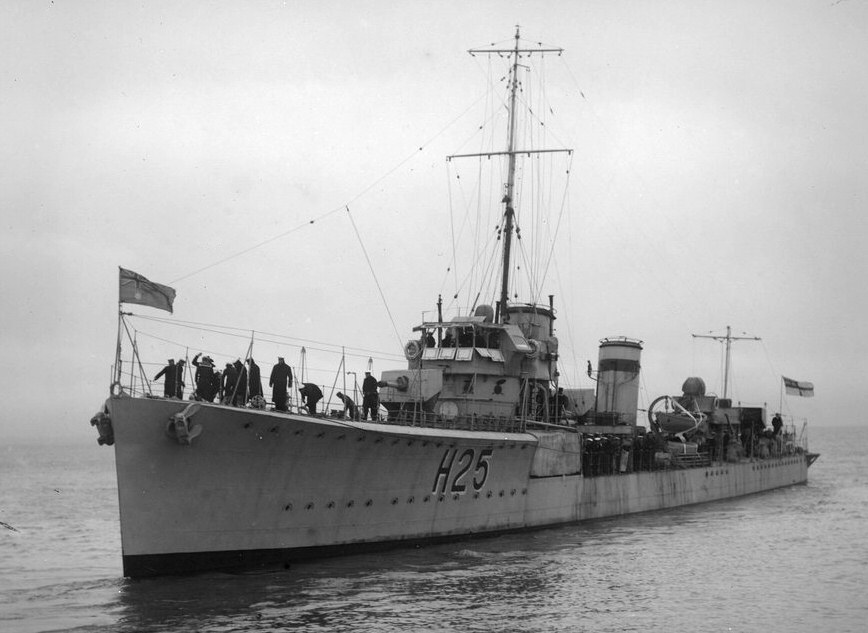
- HMAS Tasmania

History

Australia
- Namesake: State of Tasmania
- Builder: William Beardmore and Company
- Laid down: 18 December 1917
- Launched: 22 November 1918
- Completed: 22 January 1919
- Commissioned: Royal Navy: January 1919; RAN: 27 January 1920
- Decommissioned: 9 January 1928
- Fate: Sold for scrap on 4 June 1937

General characteristics
- Class & type: Admiralty S class destroyer
- Displacement: 1,075 tons
- Length: 275 ft 10.625 in (84.08988 m) length overall
- Beam: 26 ft 10 in (8.18 m)
- Propulsion: 3 × Yarrow boilers, Brown-Curtis turbines, 27,000 shp (20,000 kW), 2 shafts
- Speed: 36 knots (67 km/h; 41 mph) as designed; 32.93 knots (60.99 km/h; 37.90 mph) on power trails; 13 knots (24 km/h; 15 mph) economical
- Range: 2,589 nautical miles (4,795 km; 2,979 mi) at 11.5 knots (21.3 km/h; 13.2 mph)
- Complement: 6 officers, 93 sailors
- Armament: 3 × QF 4-inch Mk IV guns; 1 × 2-pounder pom-pom; 2 × 9.5-inch howitzers; 5 × .303-inch machine guns; 2 × twin 21-inch torpedo tube sets; 2 depth charge throwers; 4 depth charge chutes

HMAS Tasmania (H25) was an Admiralty S class destroyer of the Royal Australian Navy (RAN). Built for the Royal Navy during World War I, the ship was not completed until 1919, and spent a year commissioned but not operational in British service before being transferred to the RAN at the start of 1920. The destroyer's career was uneventful, with almost all of it spent in Australian waters. Tasmania was decommissioned in 1930, and was sold for ship breaking in 1937.

== Design and construction ==
Tasmania was built to the Admiralty design of the S-class destroyer, which was designed and built as part of the British emergency war programme. The destroyer had a displacement of 1,075 tons, a length overall of 276 feet 10.625 inches (84.39468 m), and a beam of 26 feet 10 inches (8.18 m). The propulsion machinery consisted of three Yarrow boilers feeding Brown-Curtis turbines, which supplied 27,000 shaft horsepower (20,000 kW) to the ship's two propeller shafts. Although designed with a maximum speed of 36 knots (67 km/h; 41 mph), Tasmania was only able to achieve 32.93 knots (60.99 km/h; 37.90 mph) on power trails. The destroyer's economical speed of 13 knots (24 km/h; 15 mph) gave her a range of 2,589 nautical miles (4,795 km; 2,979 mi). The ship's company was made up of 6 officers and 93 sailors.

The destroyer's primary armament consisted of three QF 4-inch Mark IV guns. These were supplemented by a 2-pounder pom-pom, two 9.5-inch howitzer bomb throwers, five .303 inch machine guns (a mix of Lewis and Maxim guns), two twin 21-inch torpedo tube sets, two depth charge throwers, and two depth charge chutes.

Tasmania was laid down by William Beardmore and Company, Limited, at Dalmuir in Scotland on 18 December 1917. The destroyer was launched on 22 November 1918, and completed on 22 January 1919. The ship was commissioned into the Royal Navy in January 1919, but was not made operational, and was marked for transfer to the RAN, along with four sister ships. Tasmania was commissioned into the RAN on 27 January 1920.

== Operational history ==
Tasmania and three of her sister ships sailed for Australia on 20 February, visiting ports in the Mediterranean, India, Singapore, and the Netherlands East Indies before reaching Sydney on 29 April. Tasmania was primarily used for training, and apart from a visit to New Guinea in 1924, remained in Australian waters.

== Decommissioning and fate ==
Tasmania paid off into reserve on 9 January 1928. She was sold to Penguins Limited for ship breaking on 4 June 1937.
