= HMAS Alfie Cam =

History
- Name: Asama (1919–1929); Alfie Cam (1929–1940)
- Owner: Neale & West, Fish Merchants, Cardiff, Wales (1919-1928); T. A. Field, Sydney, Australia (1928–1929); Cam & Sons Ltd, Sydney, Australia (1929–1940)
- Builder: Cook, Welton & Gemmell, Beverley, Yorkshire, UK (Yard No.
- Launched: 13 September 1919
- Completed: February 1920
- In service: 2 March 1920

Australia
- Name: Alfie Cam
- Commissioned: 22 July 1940
- Decommissioned: 6 July 1944
- Identification: Pennant number: FY 97
- Fate: Returned to owner on 27 September 1944
- Name: Alfie Cam
- Owner: Cam & Sons Ltd
- Fate: Struck reef on 10 July 1953 off Eden, NSW, irreparably damaged, sold and scrapped.

General characteristics (as auxiliary minesweeper)
- Tonnage: 282
- Length: 128.5 ft
- Beam: 23.6 ft
- Draught: 12.6 ft
- Installed power: T3 cyl, 85 nhp, 1 screw
- Armament: 1 × 12-pounder gun; 1 × 20mm Oerlikon cannon; 1 × .303-inch Vickers machine gun

HMAS Alfie Cam was an auxiliary minesweeper operated by the Royal Australian Navy during World War II. She was launched in 1919 in Kingston Upon Hull, Yorkshire, as Asama for Neale & West, Fish Merchants, Cardiff, Wales. The ship was purchased by T. A. Field and operated in Australian waters from 1928. She was requisitioned by the Royal Australian Navy in 1940. She was returned to her owners after the war and was later scrapped in 1953.

== Operational history ==
Originally built for use as a fishing trawler off Wales, Asama was purchased by Mr. T. A. Field and sailed to Sydney, Australia in 1928. She was purchased by Cam & Sons Pty Ltd in February 1929 and was renamed Alfie Cam.

In 1940, Alfie Cam was requisitioned on 22 June 1940 by the Royal Australian Navy for use as an auxiliary. She was used as part of Minesweeping Group 66 off Fremantle, Western Australia. Following her decommissioning in July 1944, she was returned to her owners later that year and resuming trawling. She became grounded on a reef, off Eden, near Twofold Bay, New South Wales on 10 July 1953 and damaged her hull.

== Fate ==
Too expensive to repair, she was sold in 1953 and was scrapped.
