= DT Quokka =

History

Australia
- Name: Quokka
- Namesake: The Quokka
- Builder: Shoreline Engineers, Portland, Victoria.
- Launched: October 1983
- Completed: December 1983
- Commissioned: 1994
- Decommissioned: 1998
- Identification: IMO number: 8222094
- Status: Active in private service as of 2011

General characteristics
- Type: Medium harbour tug
- Displacement: 110 tons
- Length: 18.17 metres (59.6 ft)
- Beam: 6.2 metres (20 ft)
- Draught: 2.4 metres (7.9 ft)
- Speed: 11.3 knots (20.9 km/h; 13.0 mph)

DT Quokka (1801) was a medium harbour tug operated by the Royal Australian Navy (RAN) until 1998. She was constructed by Shoreline Engineers, Portland, Victoria in 1982 and completed in December 1983. Quokka spent most of her RAN career at HMAS Stirling in Western Australia, except for a brief stint in Darwin, and was sold in 1998.

Powered by twin 8V92 (360hp) series Detroit Diesel main engines coupled to Twin Disc gearboxes and non steerable kort nozzles gave her an 11 metric ton bollard pull. Electrical power was provided by two 3-53 series Detroit Diesel engines coupled to 25kW Stamford single phase alternators. A docking was undertaken in 1995 at HMAS Stirling (Garden Island W.A) for a Lloyds hull survey and blast/paint during which time the stern tube seals were upgraded from a packed gland arrangement utilising Neox lubricant to a Chesterton mechanical seal arrangement.

She offered berthing for four and had a rudimentary galley/mess plus shower and toilet facilities and was fully air conditioned.

Normally crewed by 4 including an engineer.

Quokka is now operated by Defence Maritime Services.
