= Australian tugboat Caledonian Savior =

World War 2 era salvage and tug boat

History

Australia
- Name: Caledonian Salvor
- Builder: Basalt Rock Company, Napa
- Laid down: 19 February 1942
- Launched: 22 August 1942
- Completed: 20 May 1943
- Fate: Sold in 1958

History
- Name: Sudbury II (1958–1981); Lady Pacific (1981–1982)
- Owner: Island Tug and Barge, Vancouver
- Port of registry: Fiji
- Identification: IMO number: 5342908
- Fate: Sank after catching fire in 1982.

General characteristics
- Type: Rescue and Salvage tug boat
- Tonnage: 1,334 gross tons

Sudbury II was a salvage and rescue tug that served during World War II with the Royal Australian Navy as Caledionian Salvor, however was never commissioned. She was sold in 1958 to Island Tug & Barge Ltd, Vancouver, renamed Sudbury II, and registered as a Fijian vessel. Sudbury II undertook numerous salvage jobs in the Pacific Ocean. She was sold in 1981 and became a fishing vessel and renamed Lady Pacific.

== Fate ==
She caught fire and sank off Prince Rupert on 31 October 1982.
