= HMAS Siesta =

Australian Navy Patrol boat

History

Australia
- Name: Siesta

History

Australia
- Name: Siesta
- Fate: Burnt to the waterline in 1942

HMAS Siesta was a channel patrol boat operated by the Naval Auxiliary Patrol of the Royal Australian Navy during World War II. Siesta was destroyed in an explosion and burnt to the waterline at Fremantle, Australia, on 23 September 1942. Four crew were injured in the explosion.
