= Wattle-class crane stores lighter =

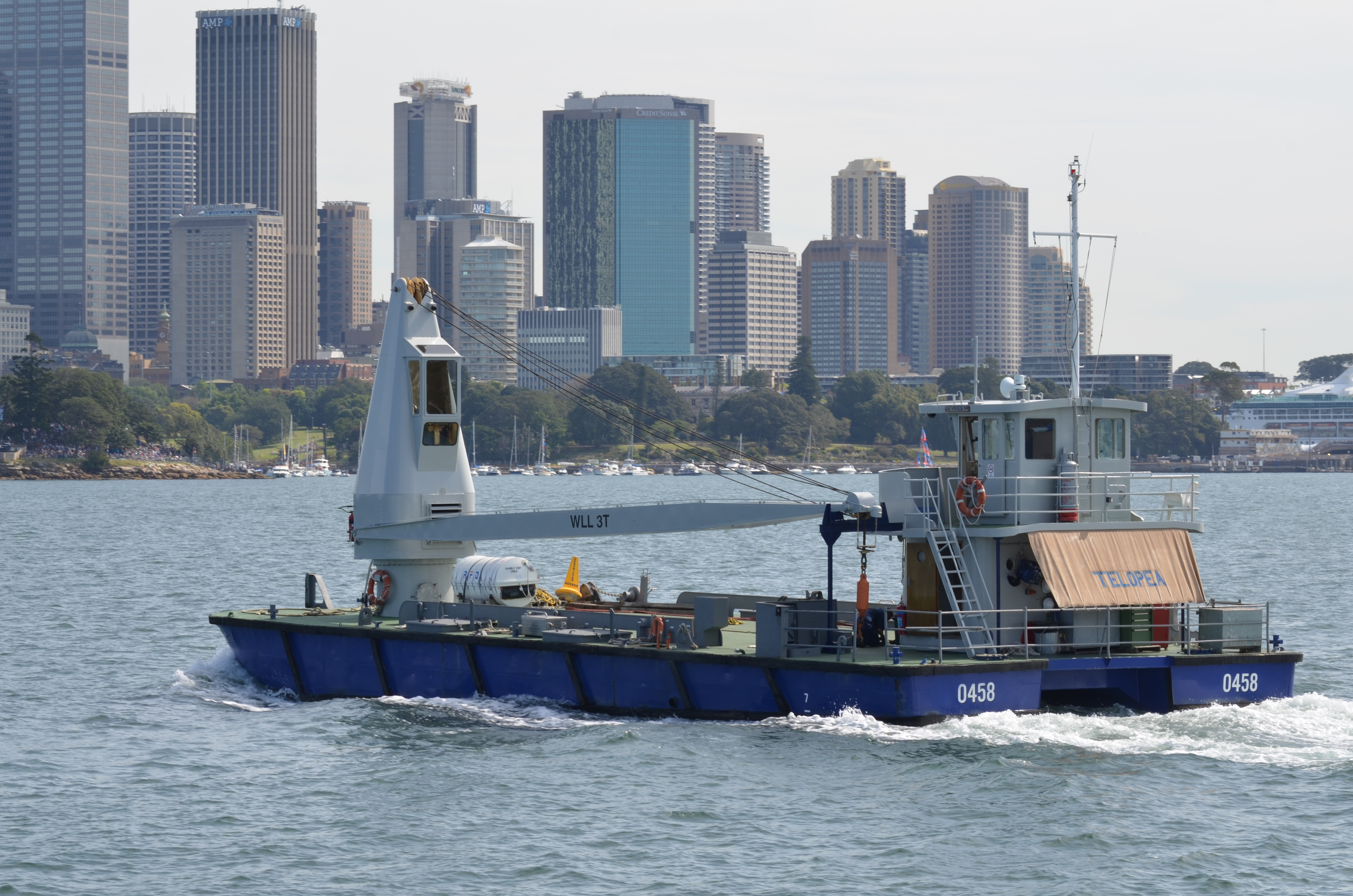
- Crane stores lighter Telopea on Sydney Harbour in October 2013

Class overview
- Name: Wattle class
- Builders: Cockatoo Island Dockyard
- Operators: Royal Australian Navy; DMS Maritime
- Built: 1972
- In service: 1972–current
- Completed: 3
- Active: 2
- Retired: 1

General characteristics
- Type: Crane stores lighter
- Displacement: 147 t (145 long tons)
- Length: 24.22 m (79 ft 6 in)
- Beam: 10 m (32 ft 10 in)
- Draft: 1.66 m (5 ft 5 in)
- Propulsion: 2 × Caterpillar D333C diesels
- Speed: 8 knots (15 km/h; 9.2 mph)
- Range: 320 nmi (590 km; 370 mi) at 8 knots (15 km/h; 9.2 mph)
- Endurance: 24 hours
- Crew: 4
- Notes: All data from

The Wattle-class crane stores lighter consists of three Australian-built lighters which have supported the Royal Australian Navy (RAN) since 1972. The vessels were originally operated by the RAN, but were transferred to DMS Maritime after 1997.

== Design and construction ==
The design of the Wattle-class crane stores lighters was based on that of the Aircraft/Water Lighter AWL 304. The craft have a catamaran hull, a small bridge and a crane with a maximum capacity of 3 tons. As built, each of the lighters was able to carry up to 30 tons of cargo.

The Wattle-class crane stores lighters were built at Cockatoo Island Dockyard in Sydney. The hulls and bridge sections were built separately in Cockatoo Island's boiler shop, and then joined together at the island's shipyard. Construction of the first craft, CSL 01, began in March 1972 and work on CSL 02 and 03 commenced in May and July of that year respectively.

== Service ==
All three Wattle-class craft entered service with the RAN in 1972; CSL 01 was accepted on 15 August, followed by CSL 02 on 25 September and CSL 03 on 31 October. They were named Wattle, Boronia and Telopea respectively in 1983.

While the Wattle-class craft were scheduled to be disposed of in 1997, they were transferred to DMS Maritime instead. Telopea was retired in 2011 according to Combat Fleets, 16th Edition. As of 2011, two remained in service, with Wattle being located at Darwin and the other two craft at Sydney. Their main role is to transport ammunition and other stores for the RAN, though they can also be used to control oil spills or tow other lighters.
