= HMAS Baralaba =

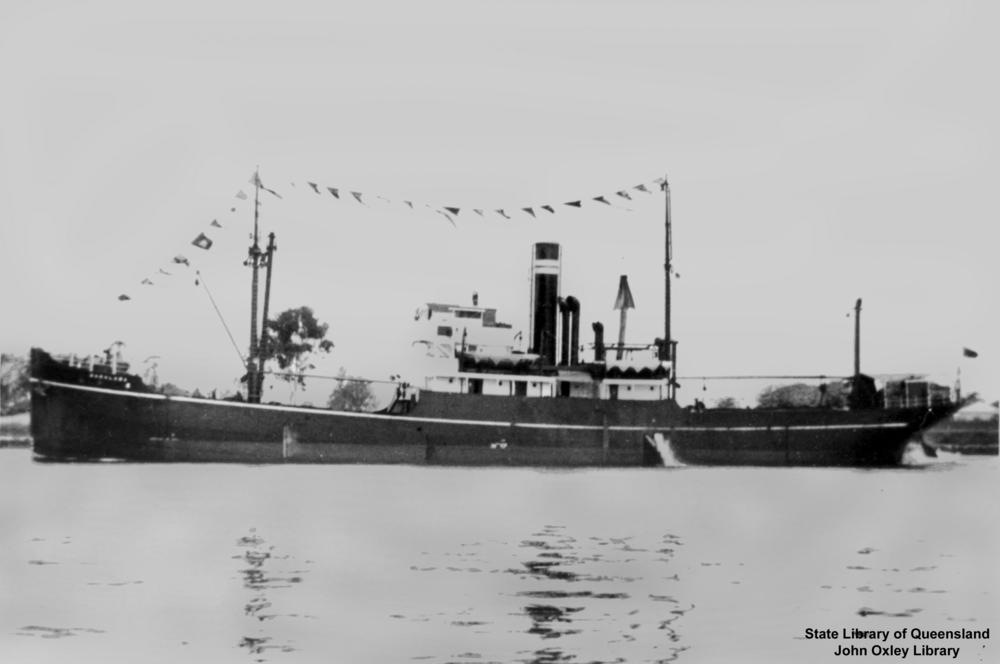
- Baralaba in 1939.

History
- Name: Nürnberg (1921-1924); Solskin (1924-1925); Baralaba (1925-1949); Brenda (1952-1956); Bayon (1956-??)
- Owner: Stettiner Neue Dampfer A G., Stettin (1921-1924); A/S Solskin, Oslo (1924-1925); Australasian United Steam Navigation Company (1925-1949)
- Builder: Stettiner Oderwerke, Stettin, Germany
- Launched: 1921

Australia
- Name: HMAS Baralaba
- Acquired: 27 May 1942
- In service: 31 May 1942
- Out of service: 19 May 1943
- Fate: Returned to owners

General characteristics
- Tonnage: 998
- Length: 211.6 feet (64.5 m)
- Beam: 33.9 feet (10.3 m)
- Draught: 11.3 feet (3.4 m)
- Propulsion: Triple expansion engine

HMAS Baralaba was an auxiliary stores carrier operated by the Royal Australian Navy (RAN).

Built in 1921 by Stettiner Oderwerke, Stettin, Germany (now Poland) as the Nürnberg for Stettiner Neue Dampfer A G., Stettin. She was sold to A/S Solskin, Oslo in August 1924 and renamed Solskin, before being sold in January 1925 to the Australasian United Steam Navigation Company and renamed Baralaba. She was requisitioned in May 1942 by the US Small Ships Command, however she was transferred to the RAN on 27 May and commissioned as HMAS Baralaba on 31 May. She was returned to her owners in February 1943.

Baralaba was subsequently sold in 1949 to San Ernesto Steamship Company, Hong Kong, to Wallem & Company in 1952 and renamed Brenda, and in 1956 to a Cambodian company and renamed Bayon.
