= HMAS Mary Cam =

Ninesweeper operated by the Royal Australian Navy

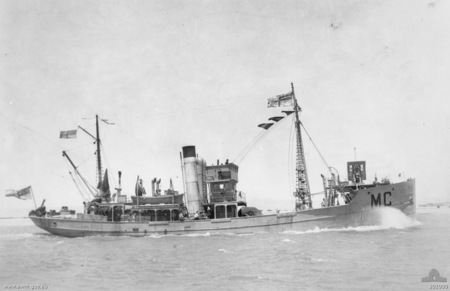
- HMAS Mary Cam

History

United Kingdom
- Name: Joule; John Fisser; Mary Cam
- Owner: Cam & Sons Pty Ltd
- Launched: 1918

History

Australia
- Name: Mary Cam
- Commissioned: 5 October 1939

General characteristics
- Tonnage: 202 gross register tonnage
- Length: 115.8 ft (35 m)
- Beam: 22.2 ft (7 m)
- Depth: 12.1 ft (4 m)
- Armament: 1 × 12-pounder gun; 1 × 20mm Oerlikon cannon; 1 × .303-inch Vickers machine gun

HMAS Mary Cam was an auxiliary minesweeper operated by the Royal Australian Navy (RAN) during World War II. She was launched in 1918 by Ritchie, Graham & Milne, Whiteinch at Glasgow as Joule. The ship operated in Australian waters from 1928, and was requisitioned by the RAN on 5 October 1939. She was returned to her owners after the war and was later scrapped in 1957.

== Operational history ==
John Fisser was purchased by Cam & Sons Pty Ltd and sailed to Sydney, Australia in 1928 after being renamed Mary Cam. The voyage from Hull took 69 days. She was accidentally grounded on Iphill Shoal in Torres Straits and was later refloated and arrived in Sydney.

On 5 October 1939, Mary Cam was requisitioned by the RAN for use as an auxiliary. She was returned to her owners and resuming trawling. She collided with the liner Wahine on 20 January 1948 and suffered a buckled bow.

She was scrapped in 1957.
