= HMAS Korowa =

Auxiliary minesweeper for the Royal Australian Navy

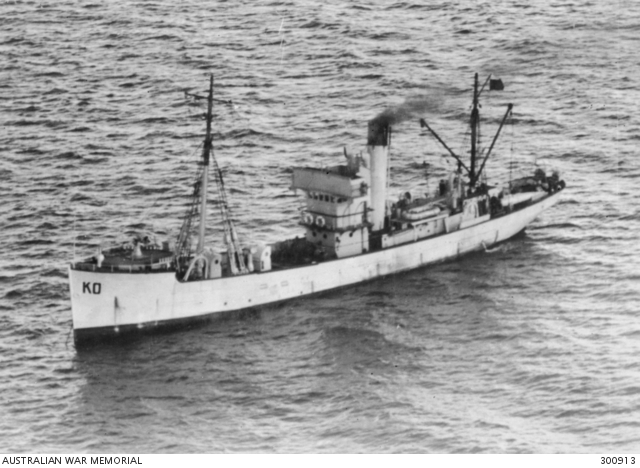
- Aerial port bow photograph of the auxiliary minesweeper HMAS Korowa.

History
- Name: Edward McGuire; Cape St. Vincent; St. Lolan; St. Lolau; Korows; Korowa
- Owner: Red Funnell Trawler Pty Ltd (1919-1939); Royal Australian Navy (1939-1954)
- Laid down: 1919 by Cochrane & Sons Ltd, Selby, England
- Launched: 17 May 1919
- Completed: 30 November 1919
- In service: 3 December 1919
- Fate: Broken up in 1954

History

Australia
- Name: Korowa
- Acquired: 14 September 1939
- Commissioned: 6 October 1939
- Decommissioned: 1946
- Fate: Restored and returned to owner before scrapping in 1954

General characteristics
- Tonnage: 324 gross tonnage
- Length: 138.3 ft (42 m)
- Beam: 23.7 ft (7 m)
- Depth: 12.7 ft (4 m)
- Armament: 1 × 12-pounder gun; 1 × 20mm Oerlikon cannon; 1 × .303-inch Vickers machine gun

HMAS Korowa was an auxiliary minesweeper operated by the Royal Australian Navy (RAN) during World War II. She was laid down in 1919 by Cochrane and Sons Ltd at Selby as the Edward McGuire. The ship operated in Australian waters from 1937, and was requisitioned by the RAN in September 1939. She was returned to her owners in 1945 before being scrapped in 1954.

== Operational history ==
The ship was launched on 17 May 1919 by Cochrane & Sons Ltd in Selby as part of the “Mersey” class for The Admiralty, and was named Edward McGuire. It was completed on 30 November 1919 and sold to West Riding Steam Trawling Co Ltd in Hull, with Thomas Hudson as the manager. On 3 December 1919, the vessel was delivered and began operating as a fishing vessel. It was registered in Hull on 19 January 1920 under the name Cape St. Vincent.

In October 1928, the ship was sold to H. Croft Baker & Sons Ltd in Grimsby, managed by Sydney C. Baker from Cleethorpes, and re-registered in Hull on 31 October 1928 as St. Lolan. On 1 October 1931, while leaving Blyth after refueling, the ship collided with the Workington steamer Galacum (built in 1915) in South Harbour, resulting in damage to both vessels. On 6 January 1932, during the return journey from the Norwegian coast, the ship ran aground at Storfjorden, Norway. With the assistance of a salvage steamer, the ship was refloated on 7 January 1932 at 9:20 pm with minor damage and continued to Grimsby.

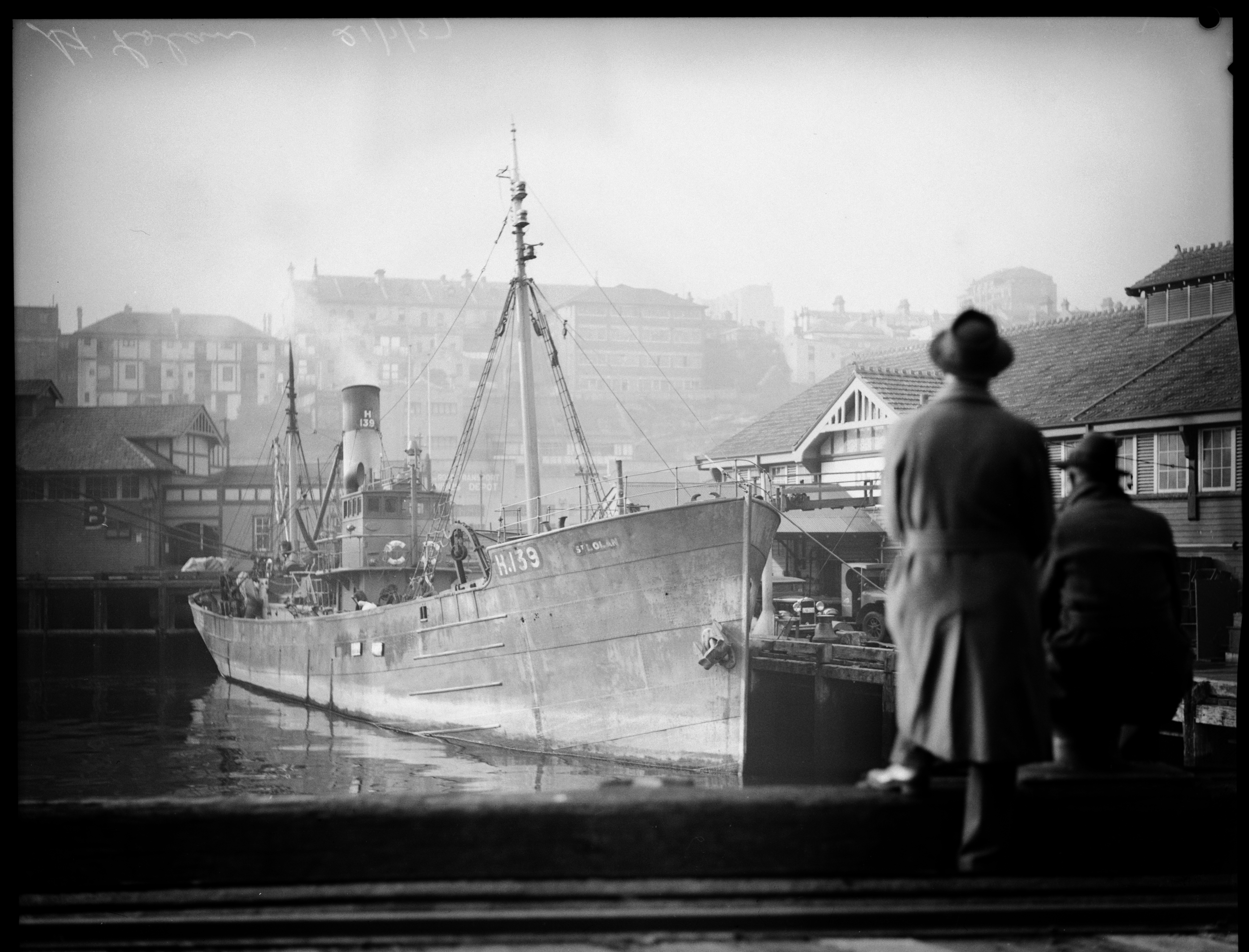
Steam trawler St. Lolan, Sydney, 1937

The ship was sold on 11 April 1934 to Boston Deep Sea Fishing & Ice Co Ltd in Fleetwood, managed by Basil A. Parkes from Cleveleys. It made its last landing at Fleetwood on 1 April 1937. On 25 May 1937, the ship was sold to Red Funnel Trawlers Pty Ltd in Sydney, New South Wales, and the Hull registry was closed on 26 May 1937. The ship was registered in Sydney on 16 July 1937 as Korowa.

St. Lolau was purchased by the Red Funnell Trawler Pty Ltd and sailed to Sydney, Australia in 1937 and was later renamed Korowa. In September 1939, Korowa was requisitioned by the RAN for use as an auxiliary and commissioned on 6 October 1939.

On 14 September 1939, the ship was requisitioned by the Royal Australian Navy for war service as a minesweeper. It was returned to the owner in February 1946 after restoration and survey in Sydney. In 1955, the ship was sold for scrapping in Sydney, and the registry was closed on 13 July 1955 after the vessel was completely dismantled.

During the war, Korowa was based initially in Melbourne before later operating out of Fremantle with Minesweeping Group 66 and operated along the West Australian coastline. She was returned to her owners in November 1945.

Korowa was broken up in 1954.
