= HMAS Leilani =

HMAS Leilani was formerly a luxury motor cruiser, commissioned as a channel patrol boat operated by the Royal Australian Navy (RAN) during World War II. Leilani was one of thirteen similar vessels, known to Sydneysiders as the 'Hollywood Fleet'.

Leilani was constructed by W L Holmes at 55 feet from bow to stern with a width of 13 feet 6 inches. Leilani was launched on 24 March 1936 as Dawn. It was owned by Ray Vaughan of Sydney.

Leilani was requisitioned on 18 June 1941 and commissioned on 21 July 1941 under command of Warrant Officer J M Gault RANR(S). Leilani was armed with a .303 machine gun with depth charges aft.

Leilani was in Sydney on the night of the Battle of Sydney Harbour, (referred to by others as the Attack on Sydney Harbour) but did not take part as her crew were on leave. Following the Battle, Leilani participated in patrol duties at Sydney, Port Kembla and Newcastle.

Along with HMAS Lolita, Leilani was fitted with new twin Ford V8 Vosper conversion engines in September 1944, and two months later sailed, with HMAS Three Cheers and AM 1496 for Brisbane. At Coffs Harbour, her port engine required extensive repairs before continuing her northern voyage on 29 November. Her purchase was finally completed at that time, with the Navy finally agreeing to pay £3,000.

By December, Leilani was on the slipway at Brisbane for four days, before continuing to New Guinea. En route, Leilani was towed by HMAS Yunnan to Townsville with Lolita. During her voyage to Cairns, Leilani ran out of fuel and was eventually towed into harbour.

By April 1945, Leilani was serving as a pilot vessel on the north coast of New Guinea at Hollandia (now Jayapura), before proceeding to her final engagement at Morotai, Indonesia.

Leilani departed Morotai in September 1945 under tow by HMAS Cootamundra. It is believed, Leilani was towed for the full voyage back to Sydney, with a stop at Coffs Harbour, where her engine was repaired 10 months earlier.

Leilani was advertised for auction on 16 February 1946, and sold for £2,900 to R Dewley of Five Dock.
