= HMVS Gordon =

History

Colony of Victoria
- Name: HMVS Gordon
- Ordered: 5 February 1885
- Builder: J. Samuel White, Cowes
- Yard number: 606
- Launched: 1884

History

Australia
- Name: HMAS Gordon
- Commissioned: 1911
- Fate: Rammed and sunk 1914

General characteristics
- Class & type: Torpedo boat
- Displacement: 12 tons
- Length: 56 ft (17 m)
- Beam: 9 ft 6 in (2.9 m)
- Draught: 4 ft 10 in (1.5 m)
- Installed power: 150 ihp (110 kW)
- Propulsion: Compound surface-condensing steam engine
- Speed: 15 kn (28 km/h)
- Complement: 11
- Armament: 3 x 1-inch Nordenfelt guns; 2 x torpedo dropping gear

HMVS Gordon was a torpedo boat operated by the Victorian Naval Forces, the Commonwealth Naval Forces, and the Royal Australian Navy. She was launched in 1884 and lost in an accident in 1914.

== Construction ==
Designed for the defence of the British colony of Victoria, Gordon was ordered on 5 February 1885. She was launched at the Cowes yard of J. Samuel White in 1884. She was 56 feet (17 m) long and displaced about 12 tons. The compound surface-condensing steam engine by G. E. Bayliss & Co. provided 150 indicated horsepower (110 kW), sufficient for about 15 knots (28 km/h).

Gordon was armed with three 1-inch Nordenfelt guns and carried two sets of dropping gear for Whitehead torpedoes. She was manned by 11 men.

== Service ==
Gordon served as a depot tender to Williamstown Dockyard from 1901 to 1914.

When the colonies of Australia were federated in 1901, Gordon became part of the Commonwealth Naval Forces. The Royal Australian Navy was formed in 1911 and from this time she was referred to as HMAS Gordon.

== Fate ==
Gordon was rammed and sunk in Port Phillip Bay by the picket boat Picket on 14 November 1914.
