= MV Falkefjell =

Swedish motorised water vessel

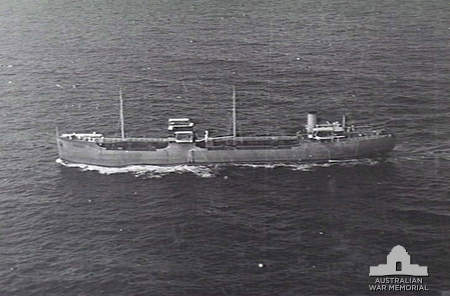
- Falkefjell c.1940

History
- Name: Falkefjell
- Owner: A/S Falkefjell, Oslo
- Builder: Kockums, Sweden
- Launched: 1931
- Fate: Broken up in 1957.

General characteristics
- Length: 461.6 ft (140.7 m)
- Beam: 59.8 ft (18.2 m)
- Draught: 34.6 ft (10.5 m)
- Speed: 11.5 knots (21.3 km/h; 13.2 mph)

Falkefjell was an 8,072-ton motor vessel built by Kockums, Sweden in 1931 for AB Falkefjell.

== Operational history ==
Falkefjell was chartered to the Anglo-Saxon Company and was requisitioned by the Royal Navy and loaned to the Royal Australian Navy as a fleet replenishment oiler in December 1941. She was returned to the British Admiralty in April 1942.

== Fate ==
Renamed Uarda in 1957, she arrived at Hong Kong on 5 December to be broken up.
