= HMAS Bonthorpe =

WWII Australian minesweeping vessel

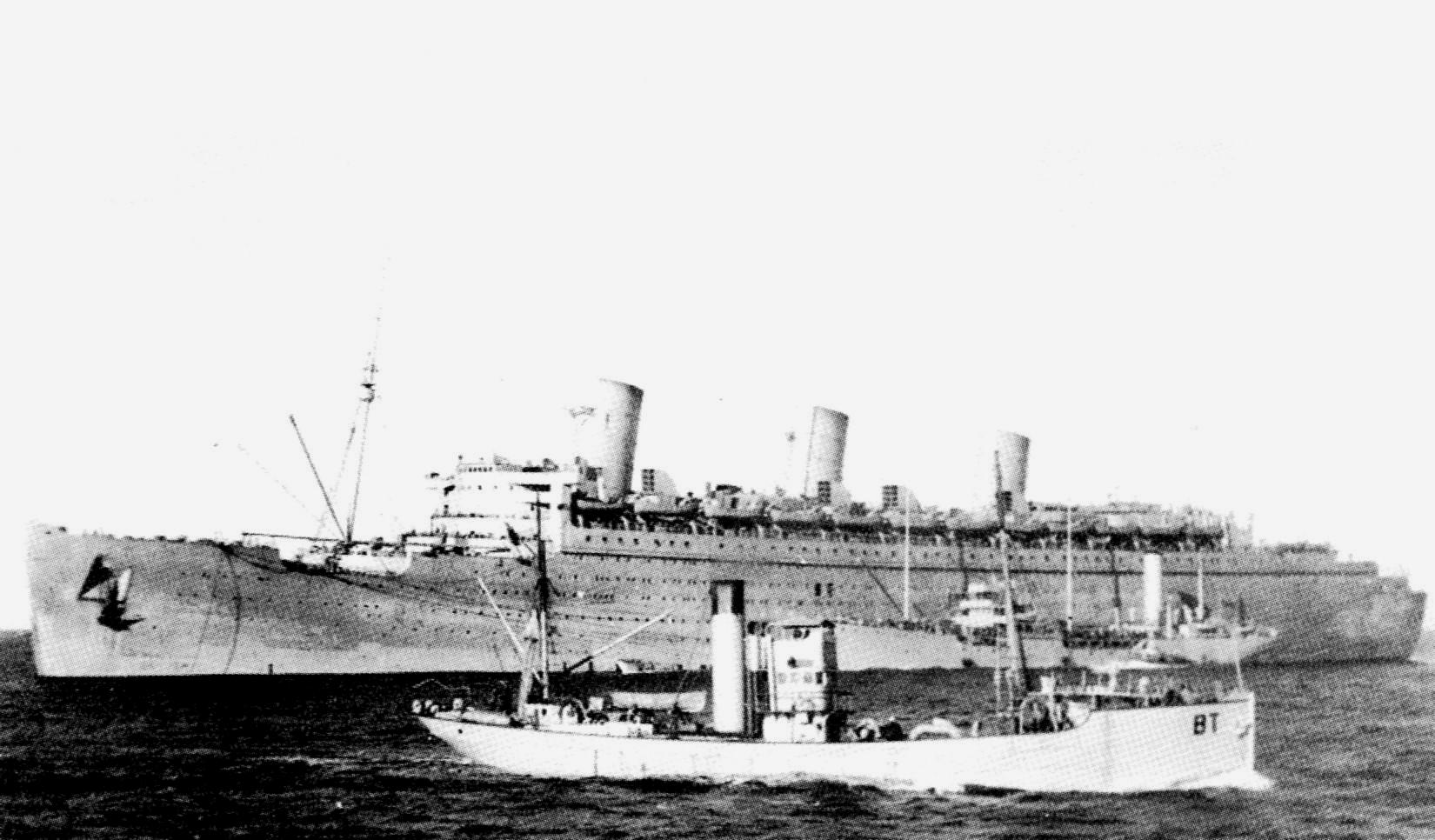
- HMS Bonthorpe (middle) passing in front of Queen Mary (rear) and HMAS Korumba (middle)

History

Canada
- Name: TR10
- Laid down: 1917
- Completed: 16 May 1918 or 6 June 1918
- In service: 1918
- Out of service: 1919
- Stricken: 1919
- Fate: sold 1926

Australia
- Name: Bonthorpe
- Commissioned: 10 December 1939 or 5 February 1940
- Decommissioned: 17 February 1945
- Identification: Pennant number: FY-85
- Fate: Sold in 1948

General characteristics
- Class & type: TR series minesweeping trawler
- Tonnage: 273 GRT
- Displacement: 85 tonnes (Standard); 248 tonnes (Full load)
- Length: 125.5 ft (38.3 m)
- Beam: 28.5 ft (8.7 m)
- Draught: 13.41 ft (4.09 m)
- Depth: 12.7 ft (3.9 m)
- Installed power: 480 ihp (360 kW) T 3-cylinder
- Speed: 10 knots (19 km/h; 12 mph)
- Crew: 20 (2 officers and 18 sailors)
- Armament: World War I; 1 X 12 pounder; World War II: 1 × 76 mm 12-pounder gun; 2 × 20 mm Oerlikon cannon; 1 × .303-inch (7.7 mm) Vickers machine gun

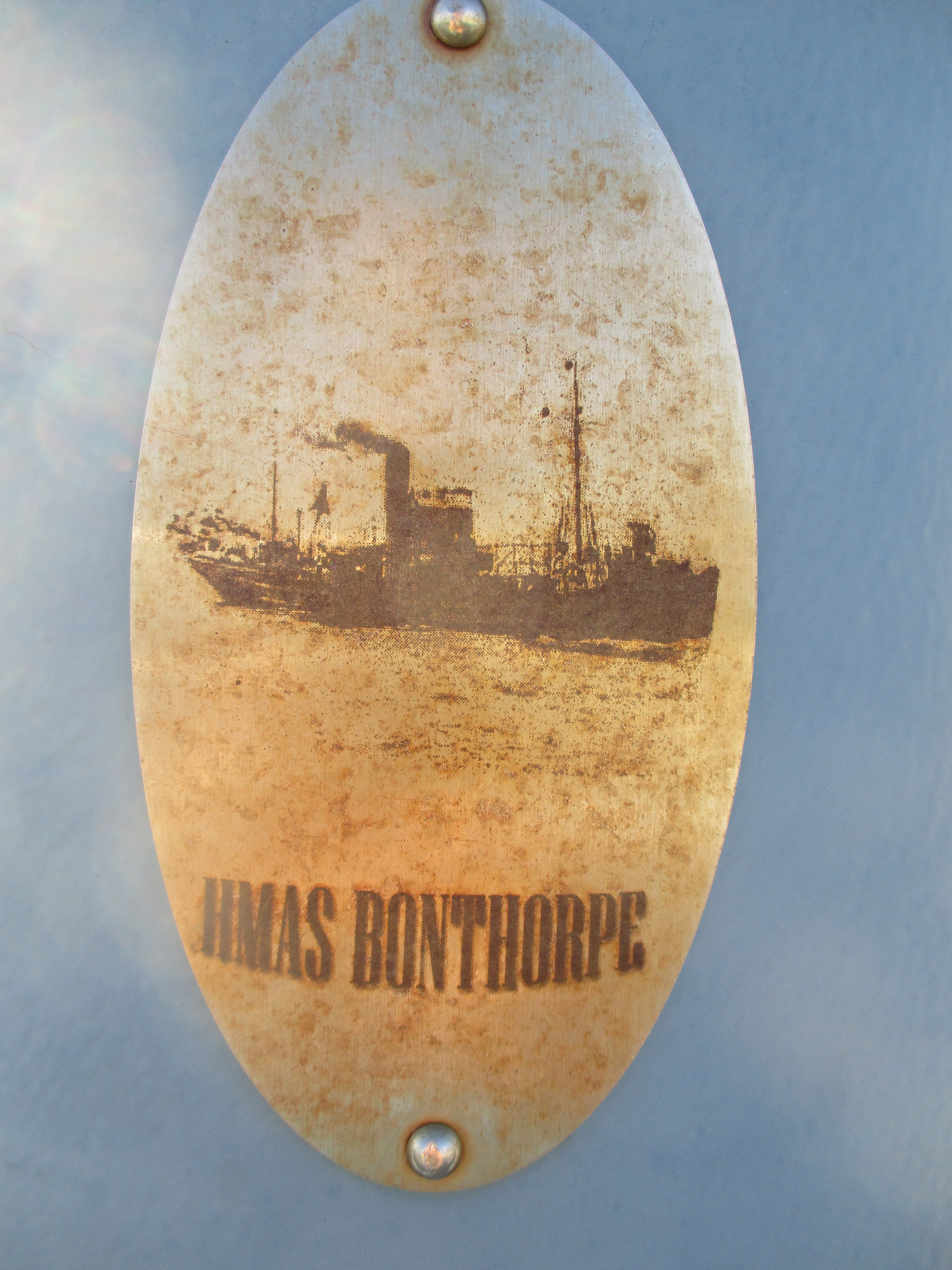
HMAS Bonthorpe commemorative marker

HMAS Bonthorpe (TR-8) was originally a Castle-class trawler/TR series minesweeping trawler TR-10 of the Royal Canadian Navy in World War I. Bonthorpe was owned and operated by Albany Tug Company. On 27 November 1939, or 5 February 1940 Bonthorpe was requisitioned by the Royal Australian Navy for use as an anti-submarine or minesweeping naval trawler. She was decommissioned on 17 February 1945 and was reconverted to a trawler before becoming stranded at Cairns Inlet, Queensland in 1959.

== Early career ==
In 1917 TR10 was constructed by Collingwood Shipbuilding Company in Collingwood, Ontario, Canada. Her construction was completed on 18 May or 26 June 1918 and she was accepted into the Royal Canadian Navy that same day.

The ship was laid up and paid off in August 1919 postwar. In 1920 the vessel was taken to Muirtown basin, Caledonian Canal, Inverness, for sale and conversion to a commercial vessel at British Admiralty expense. The ship continued in laid up status until she was sold on 26 June 1926 to a Boston deep sea fishing and ice company. The trawler was renamed Bonthorpe on 19 July 1926. In September 1927 she was chartered by Maritime Fish Corporation, LTD of Montreal, Canada for fishing in Canadian waters. From June to October 1928 Bonthorpe was fishing off the African coast south of the Canary Islands. She was sold again in May 1929 to the Western Australian Trawling Company, and sailed from Fleetwood, England, to Fremantle, Australia, departing 30 May and arriving at Geraldton on 26 August. She was sold to an unknown buyer on 17 October 1930. That company was in liquidation in 1933 and she was laid up at Fremantle with a salted boiler. She was sold again on 26 August 1933 to the Albany Tug Company and converted into a tugboat based at Fremantle. In 1939 the Albany Tug Company, a partnership of Alexander Armstrong & Capt. Clarence Douglas, broke up with Armstrong becoming sole owner.

== World War II ==
She would continue as a tug until she was requisitioned by the Royal Australian Navy (RAN) on 27 November 1939, or 5 February 1940. On 10 December 1939 or 5 February 1940 she was commissioned by the RAN as HMAS Bonthorpe with the pennant number FY-85 and would become a minesweeping, or anti-submarine trawler. The vessel was purchased by the RAN on 30 June 1944. During the war Bonthorpe was based at Fremantle and operated along the Western Australia coastline. She was decommissioned on 17 February 1945 and was laid up at Careening Bay, Garden Island, as part of the Reserve Fleet.

She was sold in 1948 to Mark Dakas, and then sold to Mrs. Mary Dakas in 1949. Sometime in 1950 the vessel was fitted out as a barge tug. On 3 October 1950 Bonthorpe was damaged after being struck by Cooramba, when the latter broke from her mooring during a 75-mile-per-hour (121 km/h) gale. She was sold on 3 April 1951 to Marine Contractors Pty, Ltd., of Cairns, Queensland. The Firm went into liquidation in 1954 and she was sold to Marine Contracting & Towing Co.. In 1955 she was laid up at Cairns, whereCorrected RAN pendant number she sank at her pier and buried under fill for a new sugar terminal at Senrab Point. Her registry was closed on 4 June 1959.
