= HMAS Eduardo =

History

United Kingdom
- Name: MFV 2045

Australia
- Name: HMAS Eduardo
- In service: 8 March 1945
- Out of service: October 1945
- Fate: Transferred to Royal Navy

General characteristics
- Armament: 1 x 40mm; 3 x 20mm Bofors

HMAS Eduardo was an auxiliary vessel operated by the Royal Australian Navy (RAN) during the Second World War. She was the Royal Navy's MFV 2045, which was loaned to the RAN and commissioned on 8 March 1945. She was used by the Services Reconnaissance Department and was paid off in October 1945 and handed back to the Royal Navy.
