= HMAS Phillip =

Depot tender of the Royal Australian Navy

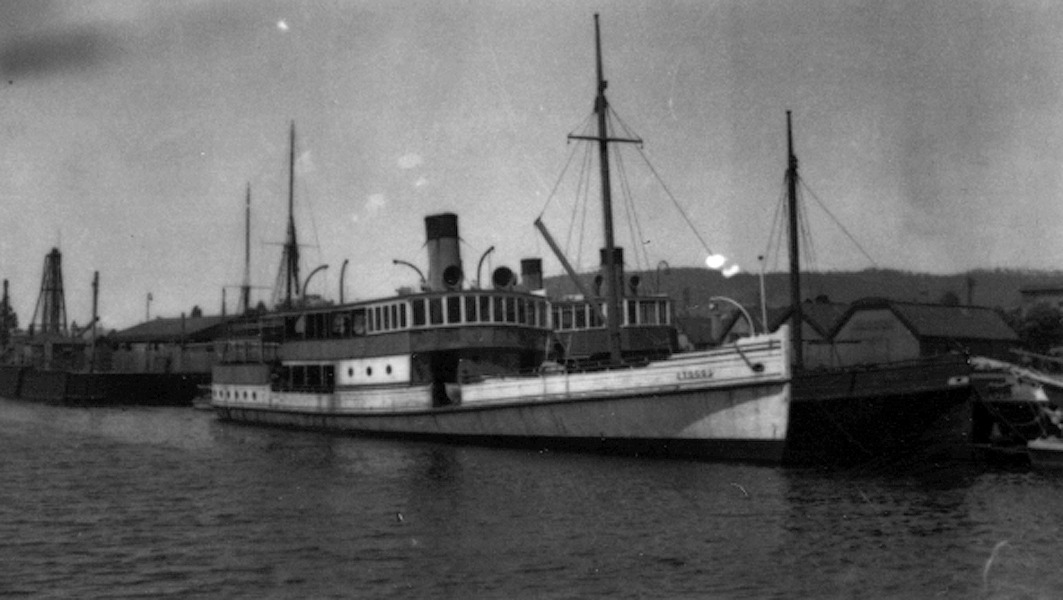
- Ferry Togo c.1905-1916

History

Australia
- Name: Togo (1905-1916), (1921-1946)
- Owner: Broomby and Dent, Launceston (1905-1944)
- Builder: Frederick Moore, Launceston, Tasmania
- Launched: 1905
- Fate: Sold to Royal Australian Navy on 14 August 1916. She was broken up in 1946.

Australia
- Name: Togo (1916-1918); Phillip (1918-1921)
- In service: 1918
- Out of service: 1921
- Fate: Sold in 1921.

HMAS Phillip was a depot tender of the Royal Australian Navy (RAN) between 1916 until 1921.

Built in 1905 by Frederick Moore at Launceston, Tasmania and launched as Togo and used for passenger service by Broomby and Dent, Launceston. She was bought by the RAN on 14 August 1916 for £7,500 and commissioned as HMAS Togo. Initially purchased for use as a tug, she was used as a depot tender for Flinders Naval Depot. She was used from October 1917 as a minesweeping training ship for the Naval Brigade. Togo was renamed HMAS Phillip in 1918 and was sold in 1921 and renamed Togo.

She was broken up in 1946.
