= HMAS Kianga =

Minesweeper operated by the Royal Australian Navy

History

Australia
- Name: Kianga
- Launched: 1922

Australia (RAN)
- Name: Kianga
- Commissioned: 16 September 1941
- Decommissioned: 17 January 1946

General characteristics
- Tonnage: 338 gross tonnage
- Length: 135.6 ft (41 m)
- Beam: 32 ft (10 m)
- Depth: 8.2 ft (2 m)
- Armament: 1 × 12-pounder gun; 1 × 20mm Oerlikon cannon; 1 × .303-inch Vickers machine gun

HMAS Kianga was an auxiliary minesweeper operated by the Royal Australian Navy (RAN) during the Second World War. She was launched in 1922 by R. J. Lucey at Narooma. The ship operated as a coastal cargo steamer and was requisitioned by the RAN in 1941. She was not returned to her owners and was scuttled off Sydney Heads.

== Operational history ==
Kianga was launched by R. J. Lucey at Narooma for Sawmillers Shipping Company in 1922. She ran aground on the Narooma bar on 5 January 1924 and was repaired at Morts Dock. She later ran aground at Binge Binge Point near Moruya on 19 June 1931.

In 1933, she was sold to the Illawarra & South Coast Steam Navigation Company. Kianga was requisitioned by the RAN on 28 July 1941 and after being fitted out was commissioned as a minesweeper on 16 September 1941. During the war she was based at Brisbane with Minesweeping Group 74. Kianga was decommissioned on 17 January 1946 and she was scuttled off Sydney Heads on 7 July 1948. 33.998217°S 151.601283°E
