= HMAS Tongkol =

Auxiliary minesweeper

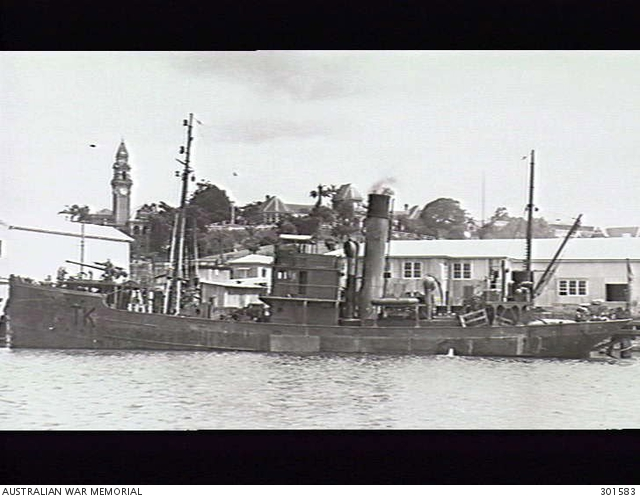

History

Australia
- Name: Tongkol
- Owner: Malayan Government; Ceylon Fisheries; A. A. Murrell (1929-1943)
- Builder: Smiths Dock Company, Middlesbrough
- Launched: 1926
- Identification: UK Identification Number: 154205
- Fate: Sold in 1947.

History

Australia
- Acquired: 7 September 1939
- Commissioned: 4 October 1939
- Fate: returned to owners in 1944

General characteristics
- Tonnage: 292 gross register tons
- Length: 125 ft (38 m)
- Beam: 24 ft (7.3 m)
- Draught: 13.7 ft (4.2 m)
- Propulsion: Triple expansion engine

HMAS Tongkol was an auxiliary minesweeper which served in the Royal Australian Navy (RAN) during World War II.

Tongkol was built in 1926 by Smiths Dock Company, Middlesbrough as a fisheries research ship for the Malaysian Government which cost £23,000. Bought by Mr A. A. Murrell in 1929 from the Ceylon Fisheries, for his Sydney fishing fleet. At the start of World War II, Tongkol was requisitioned on 7 September 1939 and was commissioned into the RAN on 4 October 1939 as an auxiliary minesweeper. She was returned to her owners in 1946. She was attached to Minesweeping Group 50, based at Sydney. She was purchased outright by the RAN in late 1943, and paid off the same year. Sold back to local fishing trade, she was placed up for auction, after her owner closed business, in 1946. Her fate is unknown after she was placed under arrest in 1947, due to a dispute.
