= HMAS Taipan =

Auxiliary vessel of Royal Australian Navy

History

Japan
- Name: Bandeong Maru
- Namesake: Bandeong (now Bandung)
- Fate: Captured

Australia
- Name: HMAS Taipan
- Fate: Transferred to Council for Scientific and Industrial Research

General characteristics
- Tonnage: 107 tons
- Length: 81 feet (25 m)
- Beam: 19.5 feet (5.9 m)
- Armament: 1 x 20mm Oerlikon

HMAS Taipan was an auxiliary vessel operated by the Royal Australian Navy (RAN) during the Second World War. She was the Japanese vessel Bandeong Maru, which was captured off Cape Leveque, West Australia in August 1944 and commissioned on 14 August 1945. She was used by the Services Reconnaissance Department and was paid off in 1945, before being sold to the Council for Scientific and Industrial Research (CSIR) in June 1947. She was later sold into private ownership and re-named Shangri La.
