= HMAS Marrawah =

Minesweeper operated by the Royal Australian Navy

History
- Name: Marrawah
- Launched: 1910
- Identification: ON 129125; Code Letters VJGK
- Fate: Scuttled off Sydney on 10 May 1951

History

Australia
- Name: Marrawah
- Commissioned: 12 December 1941
- Fate: Returned to owner

General characteristics
- Tonnage: 600 Gross register tonnage
- Length: 165 ft (50 m)
- Beam: 28.1 ft (9 m)
- Depth: 11.5 ft (4 m)
- Armament: 1 × 12-pounder gun

HMAS Marrawah was an auxiliary minesweeper operated by the Royal Australian Navy (RAN) during the Second World War. She was launched in 1910 by Van Vliet & Company of Hardinxveld in The Netherlands. Her engines were fitted in Glasgow. The ship operated in Australian waters from 1910, and was requisitioned by the RAN on 12 December 1941. In 1943, she was transferred under the control of the US Army small ships section and allotted pennant number S-178. She was returned to her owners after the war, sold to Riverside Dock & Engineering Company and hulked. Her hulk was scuttled by the Royal Australian Air Force off Sydney on 10 May 1951.
