= MSA Carole-S =

History

Australia
- Name: Carole-S
- Namesake: Carole Skoljarev, Zora Lukin
- Port of registry: (Australia) Port Adelaide
- Builder: Kali Boat Building and Repairs P/L
- Launched: 1971
- Identification: IMO number: 7730513

History

Australia
- Name: MSA Carole-S

General characteristics
- Length: 21.3

MSA Carole-S was originally a tuna pole vessel built for Stan Lukin in Adelaide by Ante Franov (Kali Boat Building and Repairs P/L). She was commenced in 1970 and launched in 1971.

She was originally named Zora after Stan Lukin's wife, Zora. Ivo Skoljarev bought the Zora from Mr Lukin in 1978 and renamed it Carole S, after his wife Carole.

Carole-S operated commercially as a fishing boat until she was chartered under the RAN's Craft of Opportunity Program for use as an auxiliary for one year around 1983. Carole-S was tuna longline fishing based out of Port Stephens NSW. In 2007 she caught fire and sank off Catherine Hill Bay NSW.
