= DT Tammar =

History

Australia
- Name: Tammar
- Namesake: The tammar wallaby
- Builder: Australian Ship Building Industries, Western Australia
- Laid down: 20 April 1983
- Launched: 10 March 1984
- Commissioned: 15 March 1984
- Decommissioned: 1998
- Identification: IMO number: 8310580
- Status: Active in private service as of 2011

General characteristics
- Displacement: 267 tons
- Length: 27 metres (89 ft)
- Beam: 8.86 metres (29.1 ft)
- Draught: 3.58 metres (11.7 ft)
- Speed: 11.5 knots (21.3 km/h; 13.2 mph)

DT Tammar (2601) was a coastal tug operated by the Royal Australian Navy (RAN) until 1998. She was constructed by the Australian Ship Building Industries, Western Australia. Tammar spent her RAN career at HMAS Stirling, Western Australia until sold in 1998.

Tammar is now operated by Defence Maritime Services.
