= HMAS Warrawee =

History

Australia
- Name: Warrawee
- Owner: Gulf Steamship Company, Port Adelaide (1909–1913); Coast Steamships Ltd (1913–1953)
- Builder: John Reid & Company, Glasgow
- Yard number: 347
- Launched: 23 February 1909
- Reinstated: UK Official Number: 122726
- Fate: Scrapped in 1953

History

Australia
- Commissioned: 18 September 1941
- Fate: Returned to owners in 1946

General characteristics
- Tonnage: 423 gross register tons
- Length: 155.7 ft (47.5 m)
- Beam: 27.1 ft (8.3 m)
- Draught: 10.1 ft (3.1 m)

HMAS Warrawee was an examination vessel and auxiliary minesweeper which served in the Royal Australian Navy (RAN) during World War II.

Warrawee was built in 1909 by John Reid & Company, Glasgow, Scotland as a cargo passenger steam ship for the Gulf Steamship Company. She plied the Port Adelaide to Edithburgh and Ardrossan run. At the start of World War II, Warrawee was requisitioned and was commissioned into the RAN as an examination vessel and auxiliary minesweeper on 18 September 1941. She was returned to her owners in 1946.

== Fate ==
She was sold to Howard G Smith in 1953 and was broken up.
