= HMAS Kweena =

History
- Name: (Australia) Kweena; (Australia) HMAS Kweena
- Owner: Mr William Ogilvy Fairweather (1933–1943, 1945–?); Royal Australian Navy (1943–1945)
- Builder: Lars Halvorsen Sons, Neutral Bay, Australia
- Launched: 1933
- In service: 1933
- Fate: In service

Australia
- Name: HMAS Kweena
- Commissioned: July 1943
- Decommissioned: March 1944
- Fate: Returned to civilian service

General characteristics
- Type: Motor cruiser/Auxiliary patrol boat
- Length: 38 ft (11.58 m) o/a
- Beam: 12 ft 6 in (3.81 m)
- Draught: 4 ft 6 in (1.37 m)
- Speed: 10 knots (19 km/h; 12 mph)

HMAS Kweena (also known as Kweena), was a motor cruiser launched in 1933, that was requisitioned and commissioned as an auxiliary patrol boat and tender vessel during World War II by the Royal Australian Navy.

== Launch and pre-war service ==
Kweena was built by Lars Halvorsen Sons of Neutral Bay, Sydney for Sydney based furniture manufacturer William Fairweather in 1933. A motor cruiser, the vessel was built for comfort, with a cruising speed of only 8 knots. Fairweather was a member of the Royal Motor Yacht Club of New South Wales, and the vessel was recorded as taking part in a local regatta in December 1934. Fairweather himself would become the Vice Commodore of the Yacht club in 1941. Kweena would remain in his ownership until June 4 1943, when she was purchased for £1,150 by the Royal Australian Navy.

== War Service ==
In August 1941, Fairweather and other members of the Yacht club joined the Auxiliary Naval Patrol Scheme, and on 4 January 1943, Kweena was requisitioned by the Royal Australian Navy to serve as an Auxiliary patrol boat. In July 1943, she was commissioned at HMAS Penguin in Sydney to serve as a tender vessel, before being relocated to the training base HMAS Assault in Nelson Bay by October 1943. She was eventually paid-off in March 1944, being sold back to Fairweather for £600 in 1945.

== Post-war service ==
Kweena's post-war service is unknown until 2004, when she was sold, before being sold again in 2006. Between 2006–2012, she underwent a complete restoration, eventually being re-launched and put on temporary display at the Australian National Maritime Museum.
