= HMAS Fremantle (J246) =

1942 Bathurst-class corvette

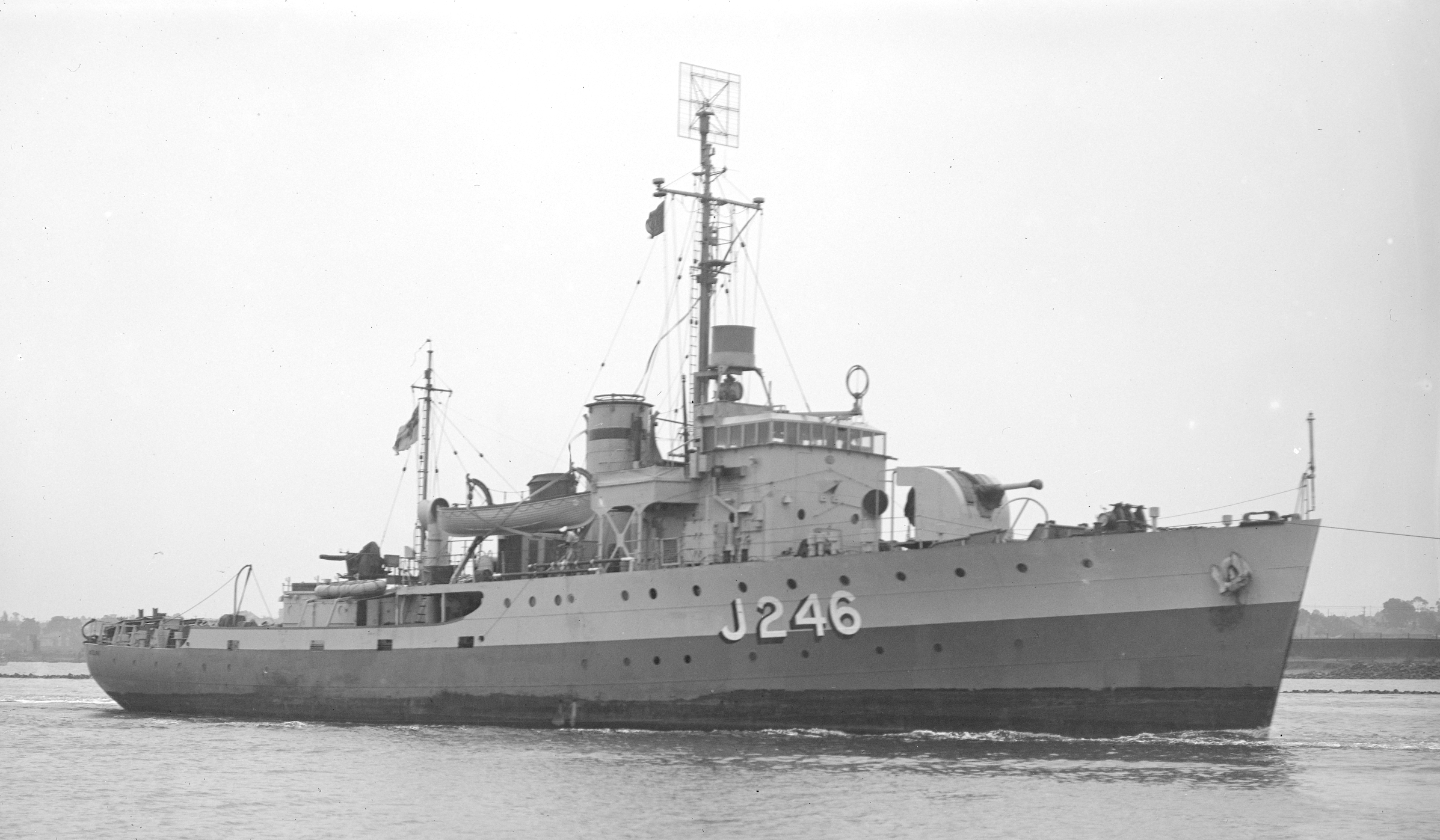
- HMAS Fremantle

History

Australia
- Namesake: City of Fremantle, Western Australia
- Builder: Evans Deakin & Co
- Launched: 18 March 1942
- Commissioned: 24 March 1943
- Decommissioned: 25 January 1946
- Recommissioned: 10 December 1952
- Decommissioned: 22 June 1959
- Reclassified: Training ship (1952)
- Motto: "Nec prece nec pretio"
- Honours and awards: Battle honours: Darwin 1943; Pacific 1943–45
- Fate: Sold for scrap in 1961
- Badge

General characteristics
- Class & type: Bathurst-class corvette
- Displacement: 650 tons (standard), 1,025 tons (full war load)
- Length: 186 ft (57 m)
- Beam: 31 ft (9.4 m)
- Draught: 8.5 ft (2.6 m)
- Propulsion: triple expansion engine, 2 shafts
- Speed: 15 knots (28 km/h; 17 mph) at 1,750 hp
- Complement: 85
- Armament: 1 × QF 4-inch (102 mm) Mk XVI gun; Depth charges chutes and throwers

HMAS Fremantle (J246/M246), named for the port city of Fremantle, Western Australia, was one of 60 Bathurst-class corvettes constructed during World War II, and one of 36 initially manned and commissioned solely by the Royal Australian Navy (RAN).

== Design and construction ==
In 1938, the Australian Commonwealth Naval Board (ACNB) identified the need for a general purpose 'local defence vessel' capable of both anti-submarine and mine-warfare duties, while easy to construct and operate. The vessel was initially envisaged as having a displacement of approximately 500 tons, a speed of at least 10 knots (19 km/h; 12 mph), and a range of 2,000 nautical miles (3,700 km; 2,300 mi) The opportunity to build a prototype in the place of a cancelled Bar-class boom defence vessel saw the proposed design increased to a 680-ton vessel, with a 15.5 knots (28.7 km/h; 17.8 mph) top speed, and a range of 2,850 nautical miles (5,280 km; 3,280 mi), armed with a 4-inch gun, equipped with asdic, and able to fitted with either depth charges or minesweeping equipment depending on the planned operations: although closer in size to a sloop than a local defence vessel, the resulting increased capabilities were accepted due to advantages over British-designed mine warfare and anti-submarine vessels. Construction of the prototype HMAS Kangaroo did not go ahead, but the plans were retained. The need for locally built 'all-rounder' vessels at the start of World War II saw the "Australian Minesweepers" (designated as such to hide their anti-submarine capability, but popularly referred to as "corvettes") approved in September 1939, with 60 constructed during the course of the war: 36 (including Fremantle) ordered by the RAN, 20 ordered by the British Admiralty but manned and commissioned as RAN vessels, and 4 for the Royal Indian Navy.

Fremantle was laid down by Evans Deakin & Co at Brisbane, Queensland. She was launched on 18 August 1942 by the wife of Prime Minister John Curtin, and commissioned into the RAN on 24 March 1943.

== Operational history ==
=== World War II ===
When Fremantle entered active service in April 1943, she was assigned to convoy escort duties along the east coast of Australia. In August 1943, the corvette was reassigned to escort convoys between Darwin and Thursday Island. She continued in this role until June 1945, when she was ordered to New Guinea waters to serve as a guard ship. Fremantle remained there until the end of World War II. The ship received two battle honours for her wartime service: "Darwin 1943" and "Pacific 1943–45".

Following the end of the war, Fremantle was sent to Hong Kong, where she joined the 21st Minesweeping Flotilla in August 1945 and took part in mine clearance operations in Chinese waters. After completing this work, the corvette returned to Australia, visiting her namesake city, Fremantle, for the first time on 18 November 1945. She later arrived in Melbourne and was paid off into reserve on 25 January 1946.

=== Post-war ===
Fremantle was recommissioned on 10 December 1952 as a training ship for National Service trainees. Based in the port of Fremantle, the corvette was also involved in fisheries protection, monitoring of the Japanese pearling fleet, and hydrographic surveys.

== Decommissioning and fate ==
Fremantle paid off to reserve for the second time on 22 June 1959. She was sold for scrapping to Kinoshita (Australia) Pty Ltd on 6 January 1961.
