= ST Gunundaal =

Australian Navy auxiliary minesweeper

History

Australia
- Name: Gunundaal; Gilbert San
- Owner: New South Wales Government Fisheries; Coastal Trawling Company; Red Funnel Fisheries; Cam & Sons
- Port of registry: Sydney
- Builder: Smiths Dock Company, South Bank
- Yard number: 595
- Launched: 3 December 1914
- Completed: January 1915
- Identification: UK Official Number: 152169
- Fate: Wrecked near Cape Howe in 1929

Australia
- Name: Gunundaal
- Fate: Returned to owners in 1918

General characteristics
- Class & type: Castle-class naval trawler
- Tonnage: 217 GRT
- Length: 115 ft (35 m)
- Beam: 22 ft (6.7 m)
- Depth: 11.9 ft (3.6 m)
- Propulsion: Triple expansion engine

ST Gunundaal was an auxiliary minesweeper operated by the Royal Australian Navy (RAN). Gunundaal was operated commercially as a fishing boat until she was acquired on 8 October 1917 for minesweeping duties during World War I. Gunundaal was returned to her owners in February 1918. She was renamed Gilbert San on 22 March 1928.

== Fate ==
Gilbert San was wrecked on a reef near Cape Howe on 4 November 1929 and declared a total loss.
