= HMAS Warreen =

Survey vessel of Royal Australian Navy

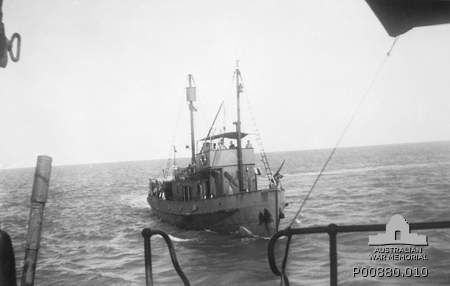
- HMAS Stella in Australian waters off the Northern Territory in December 1944

History

Australia
- Name: Warreen
- Owner: Council for Scientific and Industrial Research (1938-1942)
- Builder: Melbourne Harbour Trust, Williamstown Dockyard, Victoria
- Launched: 1938

Australia
- Name: HMAS Stella; HMAS Warreen
- Acquired: 1 October 1942
- Commissioned: 22 October 1942; 16 April 1952
- Decommissioned: 19 December 1945; 31 March 1966
- Honours and awards: Battle honours: New Guinea 1942-44

General characteristics
- Displacement: 111 tons
- Length: 82 feet (25 m)
- Beam: 19 feet (5.8 m)
- Draught: 8 feet (2.4 m)
- Installed power: 200 hp (150 kW)
- Propulsion: British Polar diesel engine
- Speed: 8 knots (15 km/h; 9.2 mph)
- Complement: 10
- Armament: 1 x 20mm Oerlikon

HMAS Warreen was a survey vessel and general purpose vessel of the Royal Australian Navy (RAN). She served twice with the RAN, as HMAS Stella during World War II and as HMAS Warreen from 1952 until 1969.

== Requisitioned ==
Launched in 1938 by the Melbourne Harbour Trust, Williamstown Dockyard, Victoria as MV Warreen for the Commonwealth Scientific and Industrial Research as a fisheries research vessel. She was requisitioned by the RAN on 1 October 1942, and after fitting out at Garden Island was commissioned on 22 October as HMAS Stella. She took part in the survey of the sea route from Milne Bay to Oro Bay, between the D'Entrecasteaux Islands and the New Guinea mainland for the proposed attack om Buna. Stella was paid off on 19 December 1945.

Stella was awarded the battle honour "New Guinea 1942-44".

== Post-war ==
Recommissioned on 16 April 1952, as HMAS Warreen, in October 1952, Warreen was involved in Operation Hurricane, the British nuclear bomb test in the lagoon in the Montebello Islands off Western Australia’s Pilbara region.

She participated in survey work on the Great Barrier Reef.

Warreen was paid off on 31 March 1966. She was sold and converted to a prawn fishing vessel.
