= Black witch =

A black witch is a practitioner of black magic.

Black witch or Black Witch may also refer to:

== Biology ==
- Ascalapha odorata, a moth species commonly named "black witch"
- Trichocladus crinitus, a shrub species commonly named "black witch-hazel"

== Fictional characters ==
- Black Witch (comics), a DC Comics character
- Black Witch, the antagonist of the video game Blade the Warrior
- Black Witch, an antagonist in the film series Fantaghirò
- Black Witch, the antagonist of the film The Magic Door
- Morgan LaFey, epithetized the "Black Witch", an antagonist in the novel series Grey Griffins
- Lina Inverse, nicknamed the "Raven-Black Witch", the protagonist of the light novel series Slayers

== Other uses ==
- The Black Witch, a 2017 novel by Laurie Forest
- Black Witch II, a tugboat and training ship of the Royal Australian Navy
- "The Black Witch", an episode of the television series The Man in Room 17

== See also ==
- Black Witchery, an American blackened black metal band
