= List of heritage buildings and sites in Williamstown, Victoria =

There are numerous heritage buildings and sites in Williamstown, Victoria, Australia.

== Syme Street ==
- Williamstown Landing Place (Syme Street). The eastern end of Commonwealth Reserve was used as an early landing place to unload stock as early as 1836, and was probably near or on the subsequent site of Gem Pier.

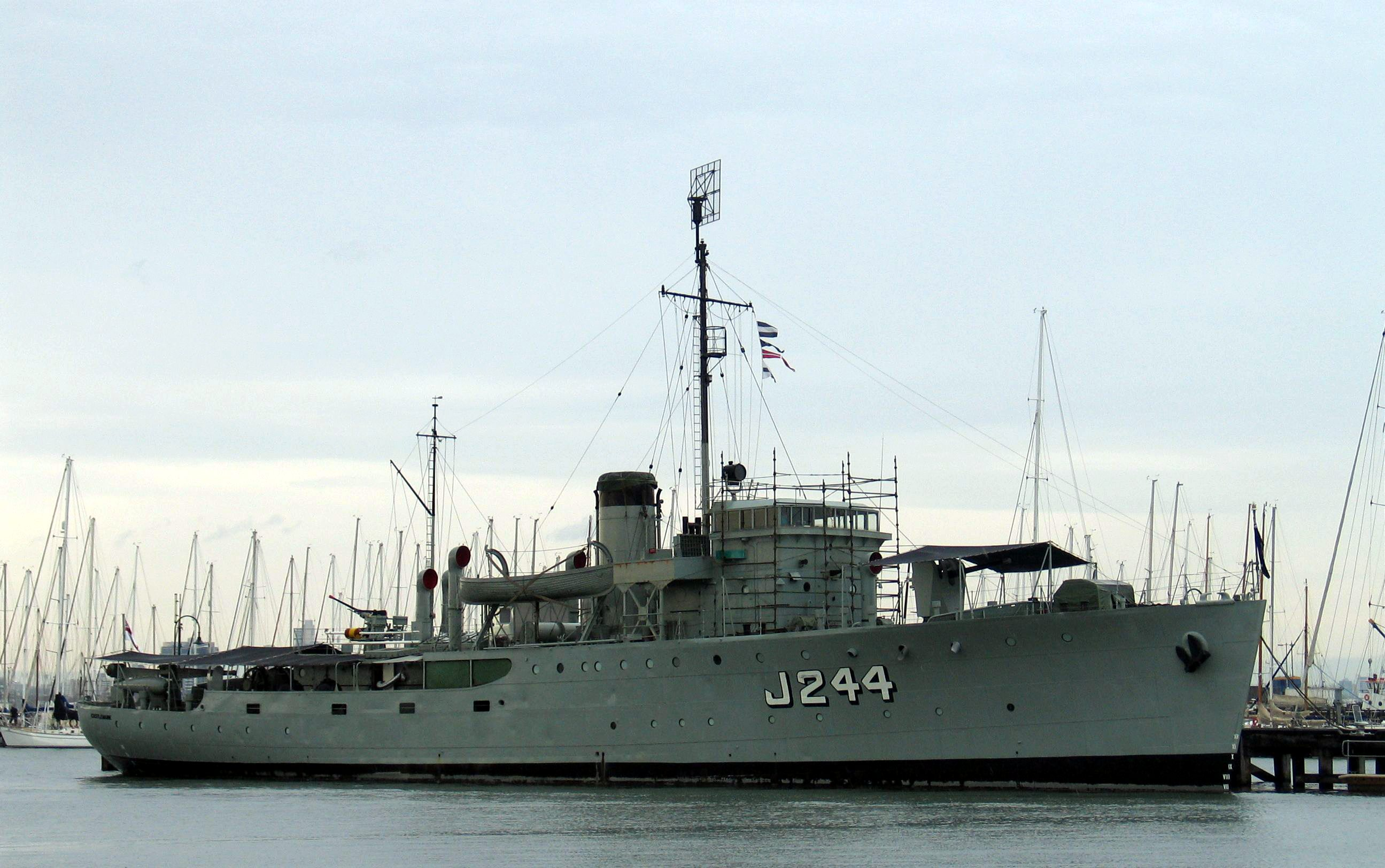
HMAS Castlemaine berthed at Gem Pier

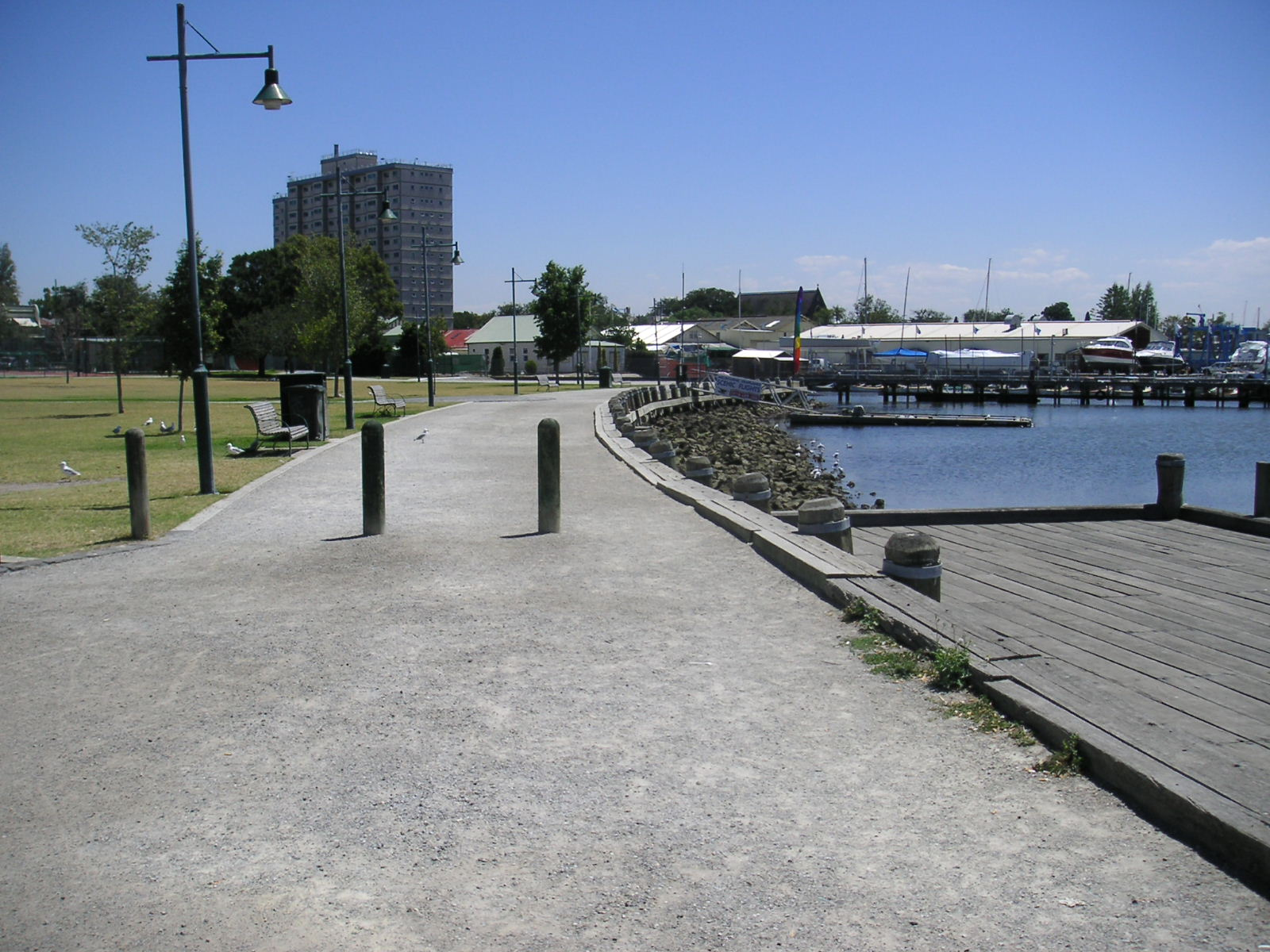
Jetty at Williamstown in Summer.

- Gem Pier & Commonwealth Reserve (Syme Street and Nelson Place). A 30-metre stone jetty was built by convict labour in 1838 where Gem Pier now stands at the end of Syme Street. Permanently stationed at Gem Pier is the Bathurst class corvette HMAS Castlemaine (1942) – a World War II minesweeper which was built at the local shipyards. It is now used as a maritime museum. Aside from the ship itself there is a collection of nautical memorabilia and exhibits within its confines. Another historic ship the Enterprize sails from Gem pier every month. Bay cruises and returns trips to Southbank also depart from Gem Pier.

== Nelson Place ==
- Tide Gauge House (Nelson Place). Built by convict labour at Point Gellibrand in 1857 to house one of three tide gauges that arrived from England in 1855, the bluestone Tide Gauge House is associated with the origin of the Australian Height Datum.
- Former Bank of Australasia (189 Nelson Place). Designed by Reed and Barnes and constructed by Pearce and Murray in 1876–77, this was the eighth branch to be constructed for the Bank since its incorporation in 1835 and is believed to be the first suburban example.
- Former Bay View Hotel (175 Nelson Place).
- The Wilkinson Memorial Drinking Fountain (Cnr Syme Street and Nelson Place).
- Former English, Scottish and Australian Bank (139 Nelson Place). Also known as the Mission to Seaman, and now occupied by Breizoz Crêpes, this building originally housed the second suburban branch of the fifteen ES&A banks known to have been built in Victoria. It was the first major purpose built bank branch in Williamstown.
- Williamstown Customs House (Cnr Syme Street and Nelson Place). A stuccoed structure erected from 1873, to designs presumably by the Public Works Department of Victoria, the building is architecturally significant as a fine and relatively intact example of conservative Classical revival style architecture. It served as a Customs House, offices and residence.
- Jacks & McIntosh Boat Repair Facilities (120 Nelson Place and 36 Syme Street). One of the first private boatbuilders in Williamstown, Jacks and McIntosh boatbuilders and shipwrights were located at the end of Thompson Street in 1841. The site is now occupied by the Royal Yacht Club of Victoria.
- Williamstown Immigration Office and Depot (120 and 123 Nelson Place). These offices were established in Nelson Place near the corner of Thompson Street in the mid to late 1850s to process new arrivals during the gold rush.
- Craigantina (125–129 Nelson Place). Comprising three two storey shops and residences, Craigantina was constructed in 1886 for John Harker Craig.
- Former Royal Hotel (85 Nelson Place). The grand scale of the Royal Hotel is a consequence of change to Victoria's licensing laws in 1877, which required hotels to have a minimum of 30 rooms of minimum dimensions to be licensed. The architect of the brick hotel, completed by 1893, was hotel specialist T. Anthoness and the builder was Henry Hick.
- The Old Morgue (Ann Street). Now situated in the old Port of Melbourne Authority site, the former morgue is one of Williamstown's early structures, important architecturally but more especially for its role in Williamstown's history. The Georgian style building is believed to be the first morgue erected in Victoria (at its original location near Gem Pier in 1859) and was constructed in bluestone with convict labour. The building was subsequently relocated three times. Access to the Morgue is by appointment or through historical tours.
- Williamstown Dockyards, including Alfred Graving Dock (Ann Street and Nelson Place). A
- Former Oriental Hotel (55 Nelson Place). There has been a building (Skelton Oriental Building) on this site since about 1850 when Benjamin Skelton built his corner building after purchasing land from the Crown in 1849 - Section 1, Allotment 8. The large three-storey flat roof with ornate parapet building was built before 1852 when it appears in a drawing of Williamstown by the famous artist, engineer and surveyor Edward Snell (designer of the Geelong Melbourne Railway). The drawing was later printed in 1854 by Quarrill as a Lithograph. With Benjamin Skelton taking a mortgage in June 1851 to develop the land with second substantial building on the Nelson Place frontage of Allotment 8, it seems that the Skelton Oriental Building is in fact pre the mortgage of June 1851 making it importantly one of the few pre-separation buildings. Pre-separation is an important heritage period which is before the Colony of Victoria separated from the Colony of NSW on 1 July 1851 and that period is pre Gold Rush too (September 1851). It is a unique building in design as well as age—the oldest remnant three-storey building.

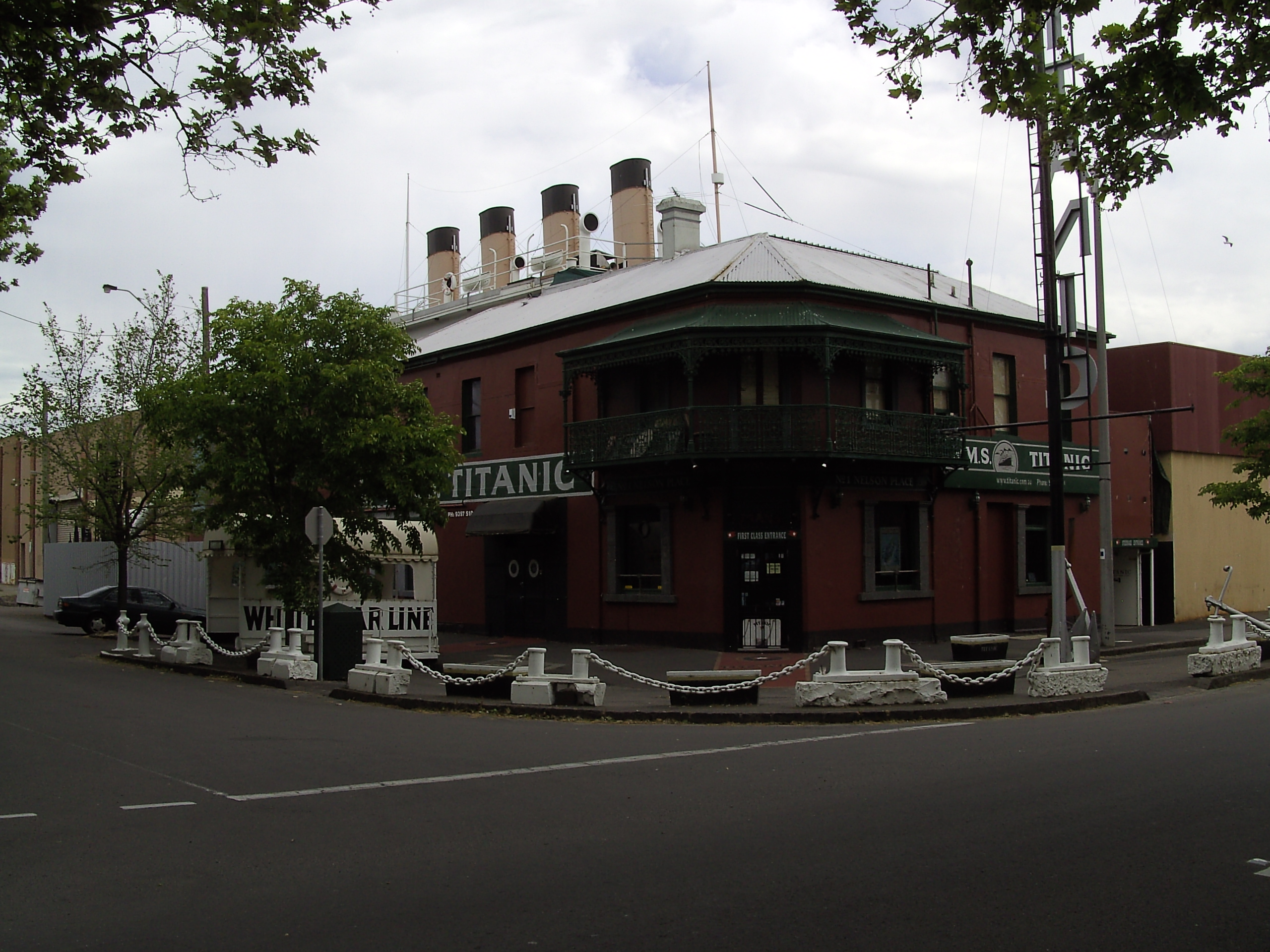
Restaurant themed after the RMS Titanic, 1 Nelson Place.

- Former Prince of Wales Hotel (1 Nelson Place). Originally constructed c.1857, possibly to a design by Charles Laing, this is one of the oldest hotels and public buildings in Williamstown. It was first owned by the surgeon John Wilkins. Today it is occupied by the Titanic Theatre Restaurant.

== Battery Road ==
- Gellibrand Pier and Breakwater Pier (off Battery Road).
- Williamstown Lighthouse or Timeball Tower at Point Gellibrand (Battery Road). Built in 1855 by convict labour, this bluestone tower originally operated as a lighthouse and still operates as a timeball. The tower is part of the Point Gellibrand Coastal Heritage Park, which is managed by Parks Victoria.
- Fort Gellibrand (Battery Road). A 2.8-hectare (6.9-acre) site located near Point Gellibrand at the southernmost tip of Williamstown, Fort Gellibrand is of historical importance to the State of Victoria for its association with the development of defence strategies for the colony in the nineteenth century and for its association with the convict hulk period of the penal system in the colony. The Point Gellibrand shore batteries were first developed as part of an immediate defensive system for the city and port of Melbourne, prior to the establishment of batteries at the Port Phillip heads. The fort site contains the only remaining visible physical evidence of the system of four battery positions at Point Gellibrand from this period. The batteries at the fort were upgraded in the 1870s and 1880s, and the fort remained an integral part of the defensive system for Port Philip up until the late 1880s and 1890s. Today, the Fort is home to a reserve commando regiment of the Australian Army, the 2 Commando Company of the 1st Commando Regiment.

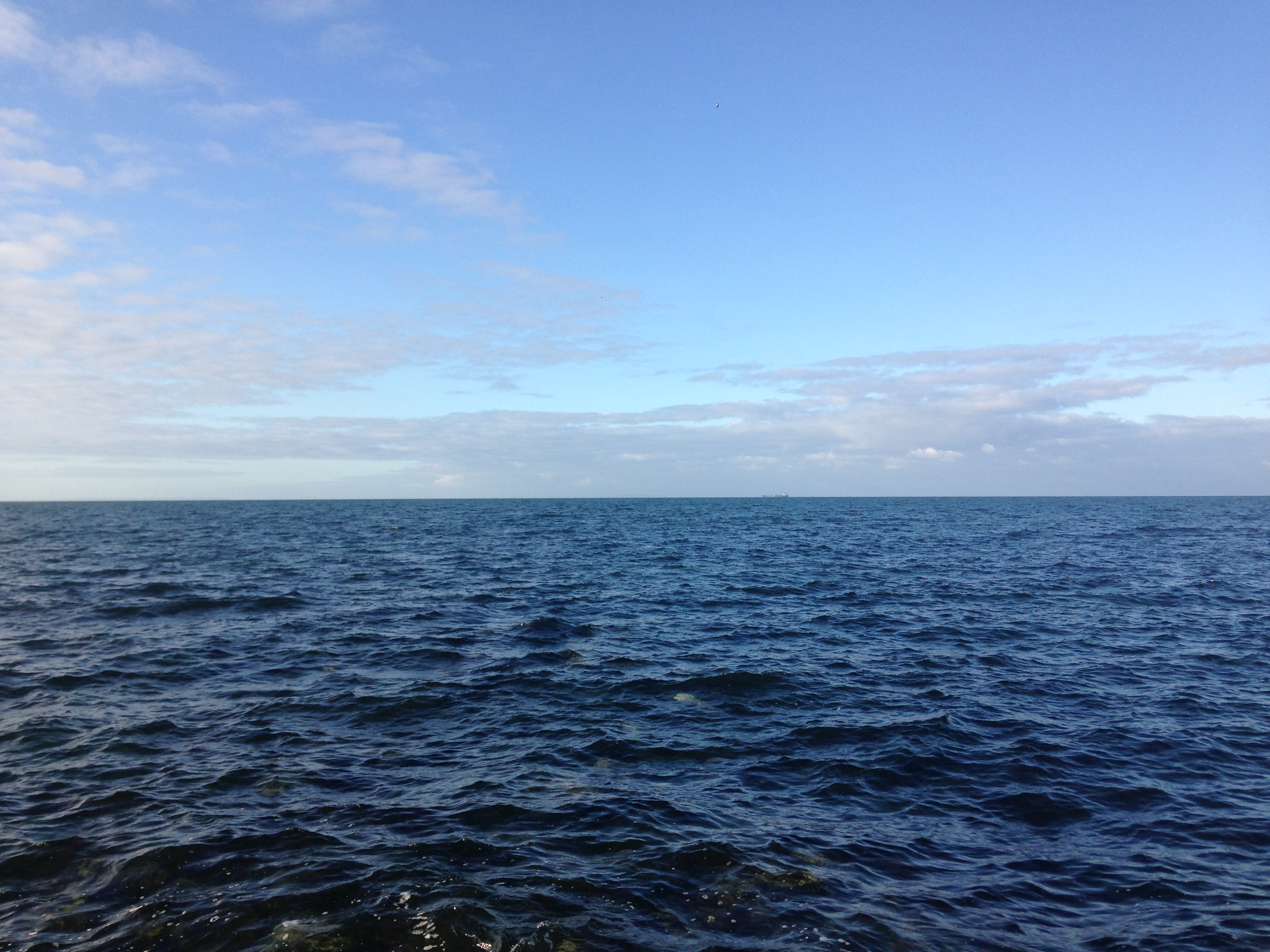
View of Port Phillip Bay from Gloucester Reserve car park, Williamstown

== The Esplanade ==
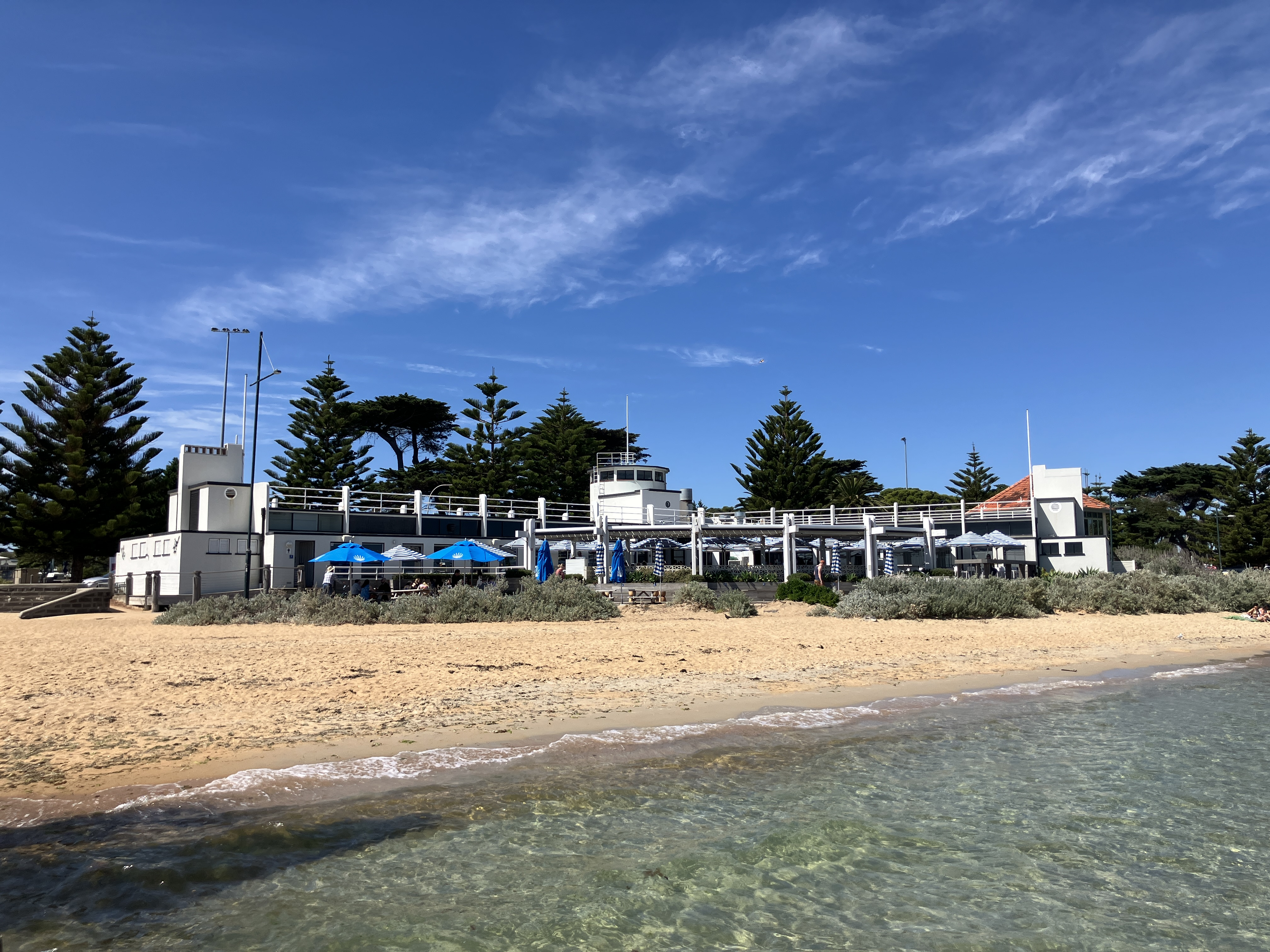
The Williamstown Dressing Pavilion, which has been refurbished as a restaurant

- The Williamstown Dressing Pavilion (The Esplanade). Constructed at Williamstown Beach in 1936, the pavilion is an architecturally significant early example of European Modernism applied to the design of a pavilion structure by two then relatively unknown architects Arnold Bridge and Alan Bogle.
- Former Lawn House (92 The Esplanade). In 1889–90 Williamstown's prolific contractor, John Garnsworthy, built this house for his own use and lived there for at least the following fifteen years until the construction of his last residence, 'White House', at 5 The Strand. Mr Garnsworthy performed a number of large civil contracts throughout the State as part of the firm of Garnsworthy & Smith. These include the first contract for the costly formation of the entrance to the Gippsland Lakes (1883 for £13,328) and the Warrnambool breakwater (1884). Locally, his firm constructed part of the MMBW pumping station and the Melbourne Glass Bottle Works complex, both in Spotswood. Mr Garnsworthy was also on the first 'election' committee for the Williamstown Cottage Hospital after its incorporation in 1893.
- The Williamstown Hospital (Railway Crescent). The Williamstown Hospital was opened on its present site in 1894. Enlarged and extended many times over the years, only part of the original building still survives and is only partly visible from Stewart Street.
- Williamstown Croquet Club Pavilion (Victoria Street). Designed by Morsby & Coates and constructed in 1930, the Williamstown Croquet Club pavilion illustrates the development of Victoria Street as a fashionable middle class enclave in Williamstown during the Interwar period.
- Williamstown Station precinct (Ann and Thompson Streets). The Williamstown railway station building and platform canopy, brick toilet block, timber and corrugated iron shed, platform, the Ann Street footbridge and the Thompson Street road bridge are all listed on the Victorian Heritage Register as it is the only substantially intact station precinct remaining from the original construction period of the Williamstown railway line.
- Williamstown Mechanics Institute (Electra Street). One of Hobsons Bay's most historic sites, the foundation stone of the present building, originally a Mechanics Institute was laid in 1860. The institute now houses the Williamstown Historic society and a wealth of memorabilia about the local area and its development through the years, in addition to the thriving Williamstown Musical Theatre Company (WMTC) which has a vast history itself and stages various Musicals, Revues and Festivals throughout the year. www.wmtc.org.au
- Excelsior Lodge of Industry Masonic Temple (Electra Street). Located close to the Mechanics Institute, this single-storey, red brick hall with a symmetrical Classical facade provides a powerful illustration of the importance of Masonic associations in the development of the Williamstown community during the nineteenth century and early twentieth century.
- Park House, former Presbyterian Manse (27 Lyons Street). Designed by architect David Ross and built in 1856, this two-storey bluestone Georgian building was purchased in 1886 by Henry Hick and renamed Park House.
- Former George Hotel (Lyons Street). An original timber building established in 1863 was replaced by the present building in 1872. The first licensee was George Gobal, a local councillor who served as Lord Mayor in 1879–80. The hotel was delicensed in 1927 and became a rooming house until 1978.
- Former City of Williamstown Municipal Offices and Town Hall (Ferguson Street). The former Williamstown Municipal Offices uses an austere form of Italian and French Renaissance typical of the 1920s in Melbourne, were opened by the State Governor, Sir Arthur Stanley, in May 1919, almost one year after the foundation stone had been laid by the Mayor of Williamstown, Cr C Knowles on 5 June 1918. Following the amalgamation in 1994 of the City Williamstown with the City of Altona (and parts of other municipalities) the majority of municipal and administrative functions were transferred to the civic centre at Civic Parade, Altona. The buildings are currently undergoing restoration.
- Former Williamstown City Council Electricity Supply Department (Bath Place). A near original example of an Interwar industrial building, the Williamstown City Council Electricity Supply Department building was designed for the Council by architects Frederick Morsby and HF Coates and constructed in 1929. This building in one of only two identified in the municipality that were directly associated with the Electricity Supply Department; the other is a former substation building in Stevedore Street.
- Former Punshon's Store (Ferguson Street). Designed by C. J. Polain, construction of this General store with cellar and roof garden was completed in 1890.
- Former Melbourne Savings Bank (Ferguson Street). This building, now a residence and Dive shop, was opened as a branch of the Melbourne Savings Bank on 14 February 1887. It became a branch of the State Savings Bank of Victoria or 'State Bank' in 1912. In 1991 it became a branch of the Commonwealth Bank until 30 June 1995.

== The Strand ==
- The Williamstown Rowing Club (End of Stanley Street, The Strand). Whilst the Rowing Club began in 1869, it did not purchase this site until 1875. The boathouse was added in 1876.
- Ruffle's Pier (The Strand). Pilot Thomas Ruffle built a stone jetty on the Strand, angled to the shore to reach deep water, sited nearby the present Anchorage Restaurant. His residence, Maxwelton, was located across the road from it. Ruffles advertised a ferry service in September 1856 and 1860, established at North Williamstown, to ply between his pier and Dalgano & Co. wharf, and to service steamers plying the Yarra. Ruffles died after an argument with locals over theft of stone from the pier structure. The wooden upper section of the jetty was removed sometime after his death in 1863 and before the construction of Barber's Pier in 1879.
- Mandalay (24 The Strand). This two-storey, colonial, Georgian derived style house was erected to the designs of surveyor William Bull in 1858 for ships chandler captain William Probert. Constructed of stuccoed bluestone, Mandalay is representative of the substantial houses which lined Hobsons Bay in the nineteenth century, many with their own piers across The Strand.
- Craigdoon (14 The Strand). Constructed in 1876–77 for Peter Murray, who sold groceries, wine and spirits at his shop in Nelson Place, three doors west of Ann Street, from the late 1860s. Mr Murray remained in this house until at least 1910, adding five rooms from 1885 onward.
- William Thomas Liley's House (12 The Strand). This stone house with six rooms was built in 1862 for one of the longest serving pilots on the harbour, William Thomas Liley. He owned the house and resided there until after 1896. John Garnsworthy lived here for a time early this century prior to building the 'White House'.
- Terrace Houses (10–11 The Strand). These two brick houses, each of six rooms, were built in 1881 for Samuel David Thomas, who had earlier been a successful gold miner and property speculator. He retained ownership of both houses until at least 1896, living in 10 and leasing 11 to various professional gentlemen, including Alex Wilson, an engineer; Richard Dowman, a Councillor; Robert Williams, a contractor; and a sea captain, Walter Vincent.
- Cast iron fence and gates of Maritimo (8–9 The Strand). On this site in 1885, William H Croker, a local solicitor who specialised in maritime law, built his impressive boom-style towered mansion. He named it 'Maritimo'. It is presumed that the fine cast-iron fence was constructed sometime soon after. Maritimo was demolished in 1973, despite a long and concerted battle by local residents and conservation groups to save it, but the early front fence was saved.
- White House (5 The Strand). Prominent Williamstown builder, John Garnsworthy (by then retired), commissioned this initially seven room stuccoed concrete house in 1907 at a reported cost of £1100. The villa was designed by him and erected under his supervision. The foundations alone cost £200, apparently in a bid to defeat the uncertain footings which had caused severe cracking in most of Williamstown's major masonry buildings. He employed a similar approach in the Modern Buildings.
- Ferguson Street Pier (Intersection of Nelson Place, The Strand and Ferguson Street). Initially called the Rosny Pier, tenders were called to construct this pier in 1924. Due to a dispute between over jurisdiction, the shoreward bluestone section of the pier was built by the Williamstown City Council, and the seaward end was built by the Melbourne Harbour Trust. In 1965, the Hobsons Bay Yacht Club was granted permission to moor its vessels on the south side of the pier, and has since expanded to occupy both sides of the pier. The pier was reconstructed in 2002/03.
- Harts boatbuilding yard (Nelson Place near Ferguson Street). Sandwiched between the Ferguson St Pier and The Dredging Depot, it constructed small boats and yachts. The boatyard was offered for sale in 1893, and the land appears to have been purchased by the Hobsons Bay Yacht Club, who still occupy the site.
- Former Port Health Officer's residence (231 Nelson Place). Listed in the Victorian Heritage Register, this former residence and surgery is a distinctive and important example of a classical Revival town residence. It was built in 1852.
- Blunts Boatyard and Slipway (Nelson Place). A rare operating example of the many small scale boat-building and repairing businesses which have operated on the Williamstown foreshore from the 1850s on, the Blunt family boat-building business has operated continuously on this site in Williamstown since the 1880s. The site is entered in the Victorian Heritage Register.
- Wlliamstown Navy Sea Cadets depot (Nelson Place, between Pasco and Parker Streets). The White Brothers operated a slipway here from at least 1877. The slipway was built on the northern side of the site, with a jetty the same length to the south. The facility is known to have been still operating in 1894. Substantial land reclamation was undertaken at the site sometime prior to 1907. Early photographs show the long pier still standing on the site in c 1925.

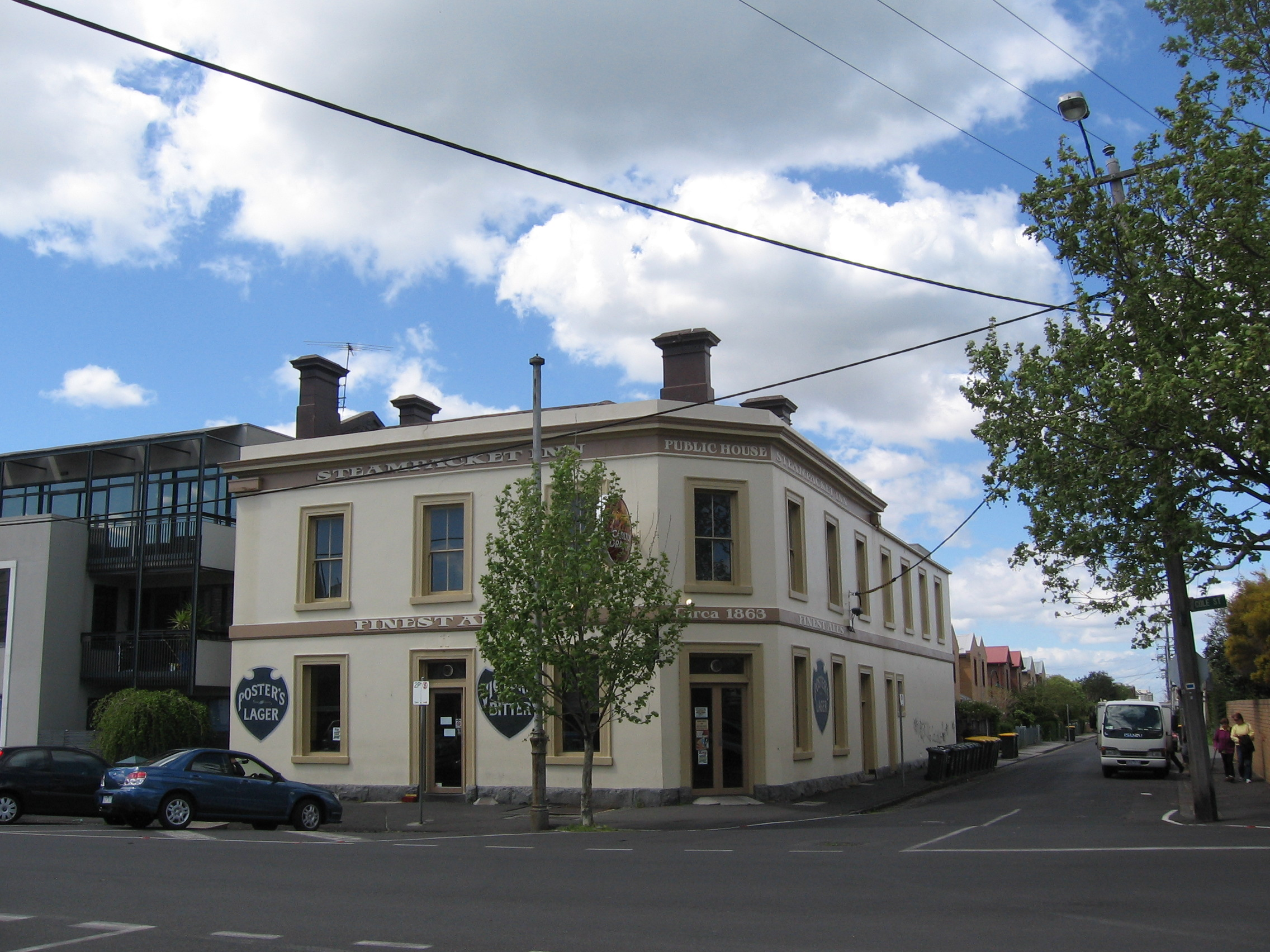
Steam Packet Hotel

- The Modern Buildings (213–215 Nelson Place). In 1909, on the former site of a timber auction rooms and wood merchant's yard owned by John Morgan, two concrete masonry shops and residences were erected by Williamstown builder John Garnsworthy. His tenants included a boot maker, a boot seller, and a watchmaker. The site is now occupied by Hobson's Choice, a restaurant.
- Former Advertiser Building (205 Nelson Place). Built between 1885 and 1888 for the proprietors of the Williamstown Advertiser, it served as both a printery for the newspaper and a shipping exchange. The building features a richly decorated facade with a frieze depicting William Caxton.
- Former Williamstown Post Office (Cole Street). Built in several stages, beginning in 1859 just after the municipality was constituted, the Post Office typified public works design of the period. Extensive alterations transformed the building in 1895.
- Steam Packet Hotel (corner Aitken and Cole Streets). A two-storey Classical Revival structure built in 1863 (to replace an earlier building), the Steam Packet Hotel was first opened in the mid-1850s.
