= HMAS Benalla (J323) =

1942 Bathurst-class corvette

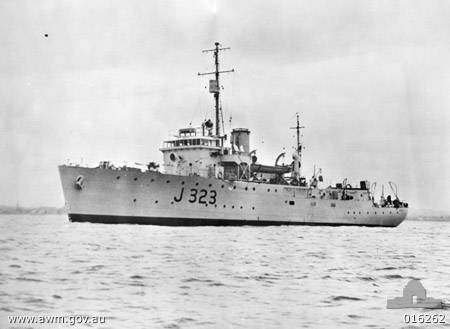
- HMAS Benalla shortly after she was commissioned. A gun shield was later fitted to her 4-inch gun.

History

Australia
- Namesake: City of Benalla, Victoria
- Builder: HMA Naval Dockyard in Williamstown, Victoria
- Laid down: 24 March 1942
- Launched: 19 December 1942
- Commissioned: 27 April 1943
- Decommissioned: 28 January 1946
- Motto: "Ducimus AlII Sequuntur"
- Honours and awards: Battle honours: New Guinea 1943–44
- Fate: Sold for scrap on 20 February 1958
- Notes: Motto shown on the badge in latin
- Badge

General characteristics
- Class & type: Bathurst-class corvette
- Displacement: 650 tons (standard), 1,025 tons (full war load)
- Length: 186 ft (57 m)
- Beam: 31 ft (9.4 m)
- Draught: 8.5 ft (2.6 m)
- Propulsion: triple expansion engine, 2 shafts
- Speed: 15 knots (28 km/h; 17 mph) at 1,750 hp
- Complement: 107
- Armament: 1 × 4 inch Mk XVI gun; 1 × 12-pounder gun (temporary installation); 3 × Oerlikon 20 mm cannons (later increased to 5, then decreased to 4); Machine guns; Depth charges chutes and throwers

HMAS Benalla (J323/M323), named for the city of Benalla, Victoria, was one of 60 Bathurst-class corvettes constructed during World War II, and one of 36 initially manned and commissioned solely by the Royal Australian Navy (RAN). Built by HMA Naval Dockyard in Victoria, Benalla was fitted out as armed survey ship instead of a minesweeper like the rest of the class, and was commissioned into the RAN in 1943.

Benalla's duties included convoy escort and performing hydrological surveys prior to amphibious landing operations. The corvette was present at the Japanese surrender of Timor at the end of the war. Post-war, Benalla performed survey work around north-west Australia until late 1945. She was decommissioned in 1946, and sold for scrapping in 1958.

== Design and construction ==
In 1938, the Australian Commonwealth Naval Board (ACNB) identified the need for a general purpose 'local defence vessel' capable of both anti-submarine and mine-warfare duties, while easy to construct and operate. The vessel was initially envisaged as having a displacement of approximately 500 tons, a speed of at least 10 knots (19 km/h; 12 mph), and a range of 2,000 nautical miles (3,700 km; 2,300 mi) The opportunity to build a prototype in the place of a cancelled Bar-class boom defence vessel saw the proposed design increased to a 680-ton vessel, with a 15.5 knots (28.7 km/h; 17.8 mph) top speed, and a range of 2,850 nautical miles (5,280 km; 3,280 mi), armed with a 4-inch gun, equipped with asdic, and able to fitted with either depth charges or minesweeping equipment depending on the planned operations: although closer in size to a sloop than a local defence vessel, the resulting increased capabilities were accepted due to advantages over British-designed mine warfare and anti-submarine vessels. Construction of the prototype HMAS Kangaroo did not go ahead, but the plans were retained. The need for locally built 'all-rounder' vessels at the start of World War II saw the "Australian Minesweepers" (designated as such to hide their anti-submarine capability, but popularly referred to as "corvettes") approved in September 1939, with 60 constructed during the course of the war: 36 (including Benalla) ordered by the RAN, 20 ordered by the British Admiralty but manned and commissioned as RAN vessels, and 4 for the Royal Indian Navy.

Despite being part of a class of minesweepers, Benalla was fitted out as an armed survey ship. Minesweeping gear was not installed, and an extension to X deck housed a large chart room. Her role resulted in an increase from the standard ship's company of 85 to 107.

Benalla was laid down at HMA Naval Dockyard in Williamstown, Victoria on 24 March 1942. She was launched on 19 December 1942 by the wife of Arthur Drakeford, serving Minister for the Air, and commissioned on 28 April 1943.

== Operational history ==
Benalla entered service on 2 June 1943, towing an ammunition lighter from Sydney to Brisbane. She worked her way up the eastern Australia coast to New Guinea, escorting a small convoy between Townsville and Milne Bay, where she would be based as a survey vessel for the rest of 1943. Arriving in New Guinea waters in late June, the corvette was immediately assigned to support the landing of United States troops on Kiriwina Island and Woodlark Island on 30 June during Operation Chronicle; these landings were unopposed as there were no Japanese soldiers on the islands. From July to September, Benalla and sister ship Shepparton led a Survey Group of vessels to perform hydrological surveys of the waters around Lae, Salamaua, and Finschhafen, in preparation of Australian troop landings at these locations. Benalla remained at Milne Bay until early December, when she proceeded to Sydney for refit.

Benalla (right) with HMAS Castlemaine (rear) and HMAS Sleuth (left) off Darwin in 1944.

Returning to survey work New Guinea in February 1944, the corvette was involved in the surveying of Seeadler Harbor and the waters around the Admiralty Islands following their capture by the United States as part of Operation Brewer in March and April. In August, she sailed for Brisbane to undergo a two-month refit. On 11 October, Benalla sailed for the Philippines via Hollandia, joining the escort of 20 Liberty ships on the second leg. In November, the corvette assisted frigate HMAS Gascoyne in surveying San Pedro Bay, before resuming work in the New Guinea area. On 6 January 1945, Benalla was sent to Darwin and assigned to a Survey Group operating off the north-western coast of Australia. She spent four months with the group, then was assigned to Fremantle from 3 May to 20 July. Returning to Darwin, Benalla was assigned to a joint Australian-Dutch group heading for Koepang, and was present when the Japanese surrender of Timor was carried out aboard HMAS Moresby on 11 September 1945.

The corvette was later awarded the battle honour "New Guinea 1943–44" in recognition of her wartime service.

Benalla resumed survey work off the north-west coast of Australia on her return from Timor, a role she would maintain until 2 November 1945, when she was ordered to Fremantle for decommissioning. The corvette was decommissioned into reserve on 28 January 1946. She was transferred from Fremantle to Melbourne, Geelong, then Sydney over the course of 1955 and 1956, and was sold to Mitsubishi Shoji Kaisha Ltd of Tokyo on 20 February 1958, who towed the vessel to Japan in April for scrapping.
