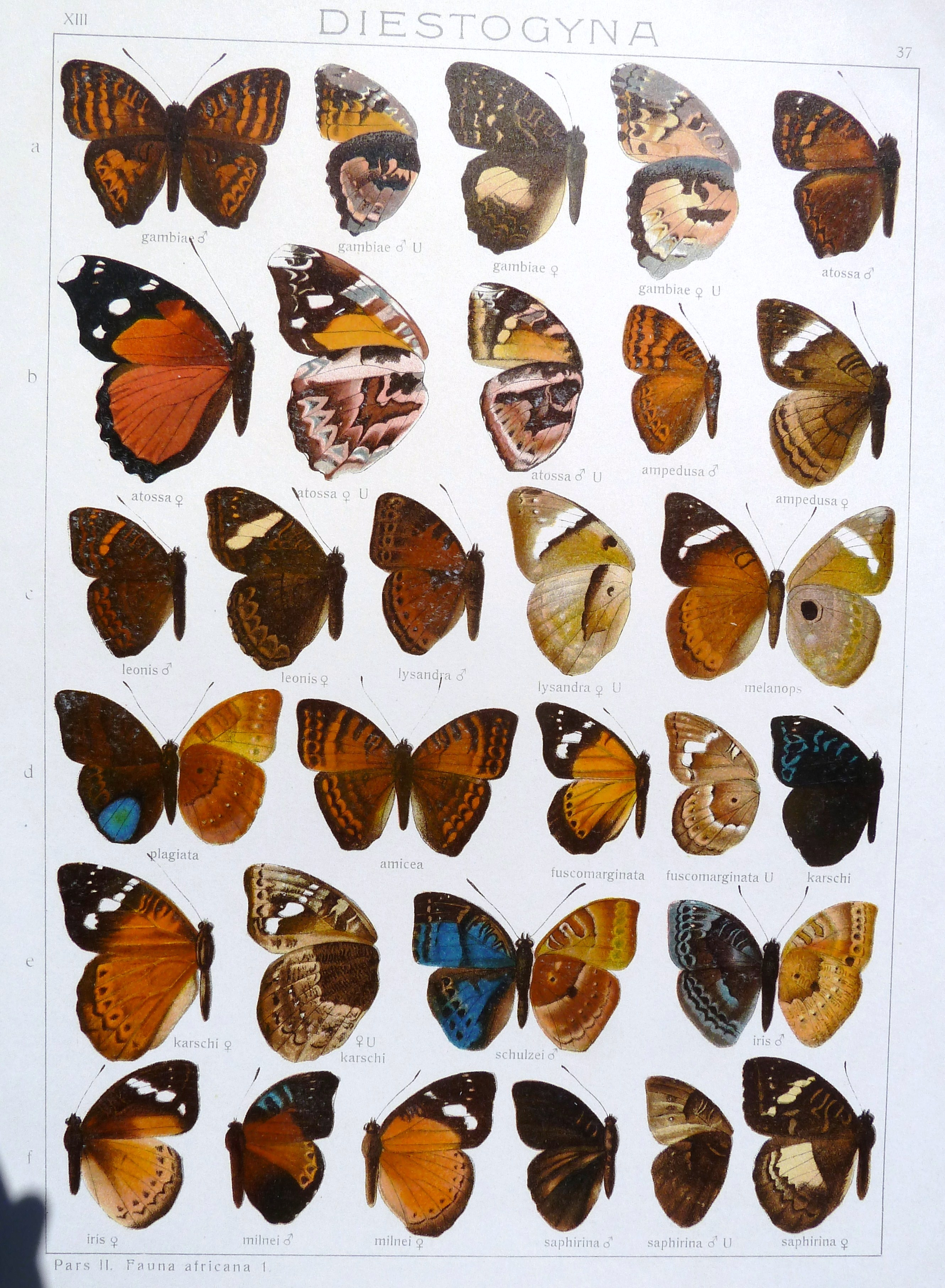
- In Adalbert Seitz's Fauna Africana

Scientific classification
- Domain: Eukaryota
- Kingdom: Animalia
- Phylum: Arthropoda
- Class: Insecta
- Order: Lepidoptera
- Family: Nymphalidae
- Genus: Euriphene
- Species: E. saphirina

Binomial name
- Euriphene saphirina (Karsch, 1894)

Synonyms
- Diestogyna saphirina Karsch, 1894; Euriphene (Euriphene) saphirina; Diestogyna umbrina Aurivillius, 1901; Diestogyna hobleyi Neave, 1904; Diestogyna itanii Carcasson, 1964; Diestogyna trioculata Talbot, 1927

= Euriphene saphirina =

Species of butterfly

Euriphene saphirina is a butterfly in the family Nymphalidae. It is found in the Democratic Republic of the Congo, Uganda, Rwanda, Burundi, Kenya, Tanzania, Zambia and Angola. The habitat consists of forests.

The larvae feed on Trichocladus ellipticus.

== Subspecies ==
- E. s. saphirina (Uganda, Rwanda, Burundi, western Kenya, north-western Tanzania, Democratic Republic of the Congo: Ubangi, Mongala, Uele, Ituri, north Kivu, Tshopo, Tshuapa, Equateur, Cataractes)
- E. s. itanii (Carcasson, 1964) (Tanzania: eastern shore of Lake Tanganyika)
- E. s. memoria Hecq, 1994 (Tanzania)
- E. s. trioculata (Talbot, 1927) (southern Democratic Republic of the Congo, Zambia, Angola)
