= 24th Minesweeping Flotilla (Australia) =

The 24th Minesweeping Flotilla was a minesweeping flotilla of the Royal Australian Navy. It was based at Darwin, Northern Territory during the Second World War and consisted of HMAS Deloraine, Katoomba, Lithgow and later Armidale.
