= Hydrographers Passage =

Deep-water shipping channel

Hydrographers Passage is a deep-water shipping channel through the Great Barrier Reef, that reduced the previous route by 250 miles.

It was discovered by James Bond, commander of the Royal Australian Navy survey ship HMAS Flinders in 1981.
