= Trichocladus goetzei =

Conservation status
- Least Concern (IUCN 3.1)

Scientific classification
- Kingdom: Plantae
- Clade: Tracheophytes
- Clade: Angiosperms
- Clade: Eudicots
- Order: Saxifragales
- Family: Hamamelidaceae
- Genus: Trichocladus
- Species: T. goetzei

Binomial name
- Trichocladus goetzei Engl.

Synonyms
- Trichocladus dentatus Hutch.

Species of flowering plant

Trichocladus goetzei is a species of plant in the family Hamamelidaceae. It is found in Malawi and Tanzania.
