= Williamstown Dockyard =

Shipyard in Victoria, Australia

Coordinates: 37°51′50″S 144°54′41″E

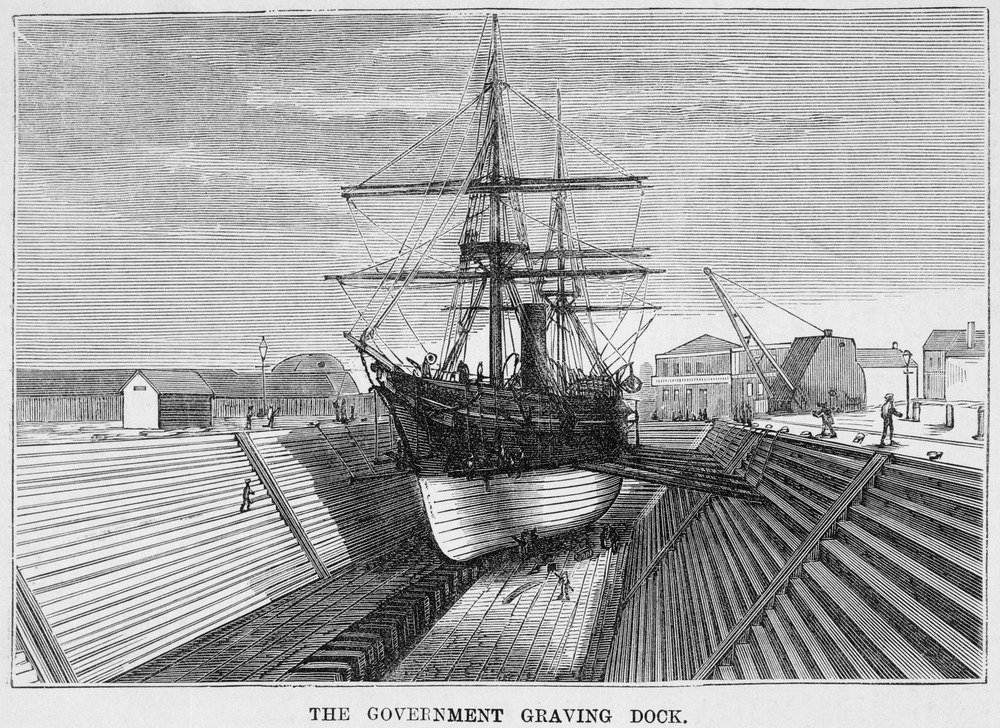
A 1878 woodcut image of the Government Graving Dock, which was also called Alfred Graving Dock, at Williamstown Dockyard

Williamstown Dockyard was one of Australia's principal ship building yards at Williamstown, Victoria, Australia.

The Colony of Victoria decided to construct a large slipway at Williamstown to provide ship repair facilities in 1856 and the Government Patent Slip was opened in 1858. Slip Pier was built in 1858 and was used in conjunction with the Government Patent Slip. The Slip Pier was later known as the Lady Loch Jetty after the similarly named Government steamer. The pier and Government Patent Slipway were demolished in 1919.

In 1858, the Colony of Victoria decided to build a graving dock and dockyard. Construction commenced in 1868, and was completed in February 1874. The Alfred Graving Dock, named after Alfred, Duke of Edinburgh, was built at a cost of £300,000. The graving dock was 143 m (469 ft) in length, 24 m (79 ft) wide, 8 m (26 ft) deep. The dock was designed by William Wardell for the Public Works Department (Victoria), and it was the largest structure of its type in the southern hemisphere.

The Dockyard Pier, originally known as Dock Pier was constructed in 1874 for use with vessels engaged in pre/post docking in the Alfred Graving Dock. In the 1870s, the railway department contracted for the construction of a new pier to meet increased demand imposed by wool and later grain handling. When completed in 1878, it was initially referred to as the Western Pier, but was later renamed New Railway Pier. It was rebuilt in 1915 and 1927 and was renamed Nelson Pier in 1923. The pier and surrounding land was purchased by the Commonwealth in 1967, and use of the facility declined. Demolition work began in 1979 due to its poor condition. Nelsons Pier West was constructed in 1978 to replace the nearby Nelson Pier. It provided two cranes and two berths for the refitting and outfitting of warships. Reid St Pier was constructed for the Melbourne Harbour Trust for exclusive use with its own floating plant in September 1891. It was later used to house the tug fleet, and was rebuilt in 1949.

In 1913, the dockyard was known as the State Shipbuilding Yard and was requisitioned in 1918 by the Commonwealth. Ownership passed to the Melbourne Harbor Trust in 1924 and during World War II it was requisitioned by the Commonwealth in 1942 and was known as HM Naval Dockyard Williamstown, or Williamstown Naval Dockyard. In 1987 it passed into private control of Tenix Defence and which was subsequently acquired by BAE Systems Australia.

== Vessels constructed at Williamstown Dockyard ==
Name	Type	Class	Completed	Notes
HMAS Kooronga	Tug		1924	
HMAS Ballarat (J184)	Corvette	Bathurst	1941	
HMAS Castlemaine (J244)	Corvette	Bathurst	1942	Preserved as museum ship in Williamstown, 600 m (2,000 ft) from the slipway where she was constructed.
HMAS Echuca (J252)	Corvette	Bathurst	1942	Transferred to RNZN on 5 March 1952, and served as HMNZS Echuca.
HMAS Geelong (J201)	Corvette	Bathurst	1942	Sank on 18 October 1944, after colliding with a tanker north of New Guinea. There were no deaths.
HMAS Horsham (J235)	Corvette	Bathurst	1942	
HMAS Benalla (J323)	Corvette	Bathurst	1943	
HMAS Shepparton (J248)	Corvette	Bathurst	1943	
HMAS Stawell (J348)	Corvette	Bathurst	1943	Transferred to RNZN on 5 March 1952, and served as HMNZS Stawell.
AV Crusader (AV2767)	Army cargo ship		1945	
HMAS Culgoa (K408)	Frigate	Bay	1945	
HMAS Anzac (D59)	Destroyer	Battle	1951	
HMAS Vendetta (D08)	Destroyer	Daring	1958	
HMAS Yarra (DE 45)	Destroyer escort	River	1961	
HMAS Derwent (DE 49)	Destroyer escort	River	1964	
HMAS Swan (DE 50)	Destroyer escort	River	1970	
TRV Tailor (803)	Torpedo recovery vessel		1971	
TRV Trevally (802)	Torpedo recovery vessel		1971	
TRV Tuna (801)	Torpedo recovery vessel		1971	
HMAS Flinders (A 312)	Survey vessel		1973	
HMAS Cook (A 219)	Survey vessel		1980	
Wallaby	Water and fuel lighter	Wallaby	1983	
Wombat	Water and fuel lighter	Wallaby	1983	
Warrigal	Water and fuel lighter	Wallaby	1984	
Wyulda	Water and fuel lighter	Wallaby	1984	
HMAS Melbourne (FFG 05)	Frigate	Adelaide	1992	
HMAS Newcastle (FFG 06)	Frigate	Adelaide	1994	
HMAS Anzac (FFH 150)	Frigate	Anzac	1996	
HMNZS Te Kaha (F77)	Frigate	Anzac	1997	
HMAS Arunta (FFH 151)	Frigate	Anzac	1998	
HMNZS Te Mana (F111)	Frigate	Anzac	1999	
HMAS Warramunga (FFH 152)	Frigate	Anzac	2001	
HMAS Stuart (FFH 153)	Frigate	Anzac	2002	
HMAS Parramatta (FFH 154)	Frigate	Anzac	2003	
HMAS Ballarat (FFH 155)	Frigate	Anzac	2004	
HMAS Toowoomba (FFH 156)	Frigate	Anzac	2005	
HMAS Perth (FFH 157)	Frigate	Anzac	2006	
HMNZS Otago (P148)	Offshore patrol vessel	Protector	2010	
HMNZS Wellington (P55)	Offshore Patrol Vessel	Protector	2010	
HMAS Canberra (L02)	Landing helicopter dock	Canberra	2014	Hull constructed by Navantia in Ferrol, Spain.
HMAS Adelaide (L01)	Landing helicopter dock	Canberra	2015	Hull constructed by Navantia in Ferrol, Spain.
