= HMAS Vigilant =

Australian auxiliary patrol boat

- HMAS Vigilant in July 1941. The deck awnings were removed at the outbreak of the Pacific War.

History

Australia
- Builder: Cockatoo Island Dockyard, Sydney
- Yard number: 120
- Launched: 12 February 1938
- Acquired: October 1940
- Commissioned: 12 November 1940
- Decommissioned: 12 November 1945
- Renamed: HMAS Sleuth, 17 April 1944; Renamed HMAS Hawk, 13 March 1945
- Home port: Originally Townsville, later Darwin
- Honours and awards: Battle honours: Darwin 1942–43; Pacific 1942–43
- Fate: Scuttled in 1966

General characteristics
- Displacement: 106 tons standard
- Length: 102 ft (31 m)
- Propulsion: 2 × 16 cylinder 320hp Gleniffer diesel
- Speed: 14.7 knots (27.2 km/h; 16.9 mph)
- Boats & landing craft carried: 2 motor life boats
- Complement: 15
- Armament: 3-pounder QF, 20mm Oerlikon AA, light arms

HMAS Vigilant (later known as HMAS Sleuth and HMAS Hawk) was an auxiliary patrol boat serving with the Royal Australian Navy during the Second World War. Notably it was the 120th ship built by the Cockatoo Island Dockyard and the first aluminium ship built in Australia.

== History ==
PV Vigilant was a prototype ship designed and built at Cockatoo Island Dockyard in 1937–38. The hull and wheelhouse were constructed entirely of aluminium to save weight. As a result, the 102-foot (31 m) ship had a total displacement of only 106 tons.

It was built for the Department of Trade and Customs, intended for use patrolling waters to the north of Australia in conjunction with the Kuru. It was initially based at Townsville.

== Naval service ==
The ship was still undergoing sea trials when it was requisitioned by the Royal Australian Navy in October 1940, commissioning as HMAS Vigilant on 12 November 1940. It was classed as an auxiliary patrol vessel. It was initially equipped with a 3-pounder QF gun but this was replaced with a 20 mm Oerlikon. As well as the mounted gun, it carried a variety of light arms including a Bren light machine gun.

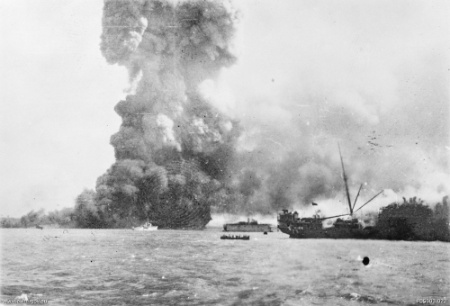
The SS Neptuna explodes during the Bombing of Darwin on 19 February 1942. HMAS Vigilant is directly in front of the explosion.

Vigilant was transferred to Darwin, Northern Territory in 1941 and was used for protecting the harbour approaches. During the Bombing of Darwin, Vigilant engaged some of the attacking aircraft with its 20 mm Oerlikon and later assisted in picking up survivors from the water in Darwin Harbour.

Vigilant, with a hold capacity of 7 tons, played an important role in the Battle of Timor from May 1942 and made several supply trips to the island. During one of these supply voyages, it assisted in the search for survivors from HMAS Armidale. During this time, it also resupplied corvettes operating in the Timor Sea with depth charges.

HMAS Vigilant was renamed HMAS Sleuth on 17 April 1944 and HMAS Hawk on 13 March 1945. Hawk was paid off on 12 November 1945.

== Post-war service ==
After the war, the ship was returned to the Department of Trade and Customs as PV Vigilant, and served as a whaling patrol ship off Western Australia until 1965. Despite attempts to save the ship for preservation, it was scuttled off Sydney in April 1966.

== Legacy ==
Vigilant Close in Bentley Park, Queensland is named after HMAS Vigilant.

Following an overhaul of the RAN battle honours system, completed in March 2010, the RAN decided that, in recognition of the vessel's wartime service, future ships named HMAS Vigilant would be entitled to carry the honours "Darwin 1942–43" and "Pacific 1942–43".

== Gallery ==
General arrangement plan

HMAS Sleuth with the corvettes Castlemaine and Benalla off Darwin in 1944.
