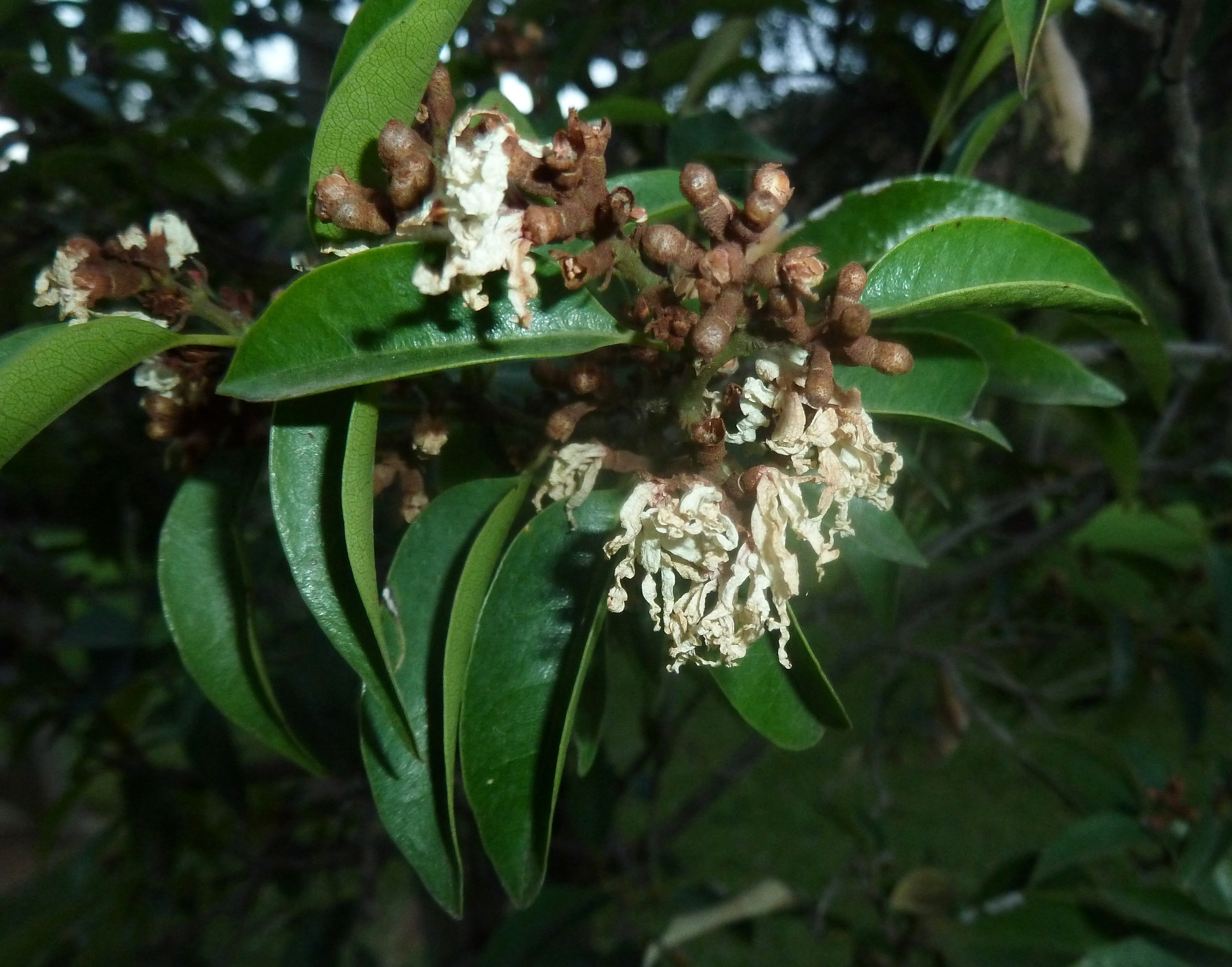

Scientific classification
- Kingdom: Plantae
- Clade: Tracheophytes
- Clade: Angiosperms
- Clade: Eudicots
- Order: Saxifragales
- Family: Hamamelidaceae
- Genus: Trichocladus
- Species: T. grandiflorus

Binomial name
- Trichocladus grandiflorus Oliv.

= Trichocladus grandiflorus =

Species of flowering plant

Trichocladus grandiflorus is a species in the genus Trichocladus, in the family Hamamelidaceae. It is also called splendid witch-hazel.

== Description and range ==
The evergreen Trichocladus grandiflorus, though sometimes a shrub, is typically found in the form of a tree, to 7 meters, and occasionally grows very large, up to 30 meters. It is native to South Africa and Eswatini, where it may be found on the fringes of mountain mist-belt forests, in wooded ravines, and in low-altitude evergreen forests.

Leaves: Its leaves are alternate or opposite, and are ovate to lanceolate, with a pointed tip and slightly more rounded base. Young leaves are a conspicuous bronzy reddish-brown, with velvet-like hairs, but soon change, becoming pale and glabrous on the undersides, with very prominent veins, and remaining glossy green above. Adult leaves tend to be between 5 cm and 10 cm in length, and 2.5–5 cm wide.

Flowers: Handsome flowers, nearly 4 cm in diameter, in loose axillary or terminal heads, are white tinged, becoming purple near the base, and closely resemble Hamamelis in shape. Petals are crinkly and long, to 2.5 cm, and at 4 cm in diameter are comparatively broad for this genus. Male and female parts are borne on separate flowers, either on the same specimen or different specimens (may be either monoecious or dioecious). Flowers from December to January.

Fruit: Small, dark, 2-valved capsules that appear 4-valved at the apex are borne from February to May, but may be much later.

== Cultivation ==
These attractive trees are not difficult to cultivate, but remain surprisingly little known and rarely cultivated in gardens. Grows well in cool (temperate) greenhouses. Compost and care similar to that of Gardenia.

== Etymology ==
Trichocladus is derived from the Greek terms trichos (τριχός; gen. 'hair') and klados (κλάδος; 'branch') and means approximately 'hairy-branched'. Grandiflorus derives from Latin terms grandis ('grand, large') and florum (gen. 'flower') and means approximately 'with large flowers'.

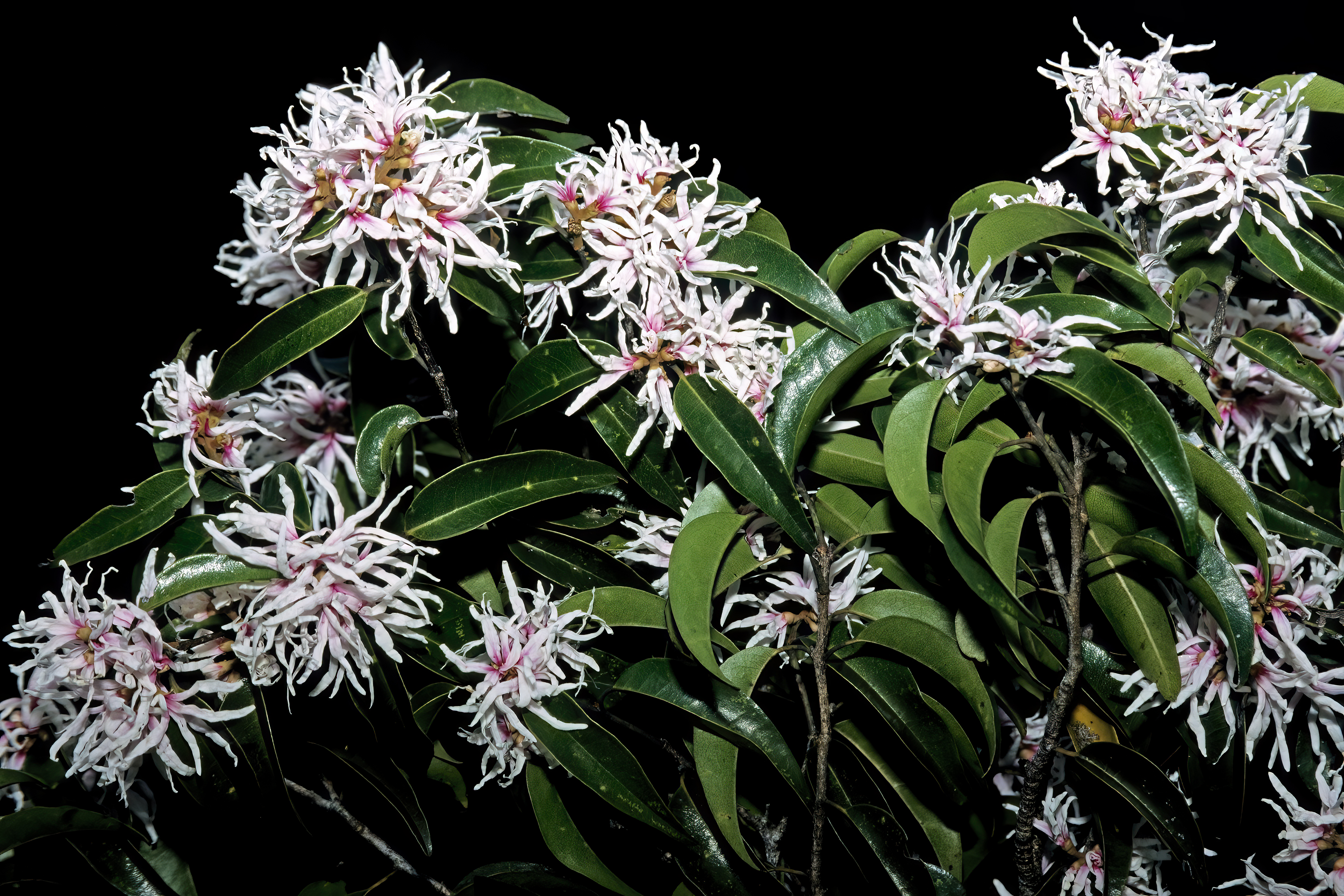

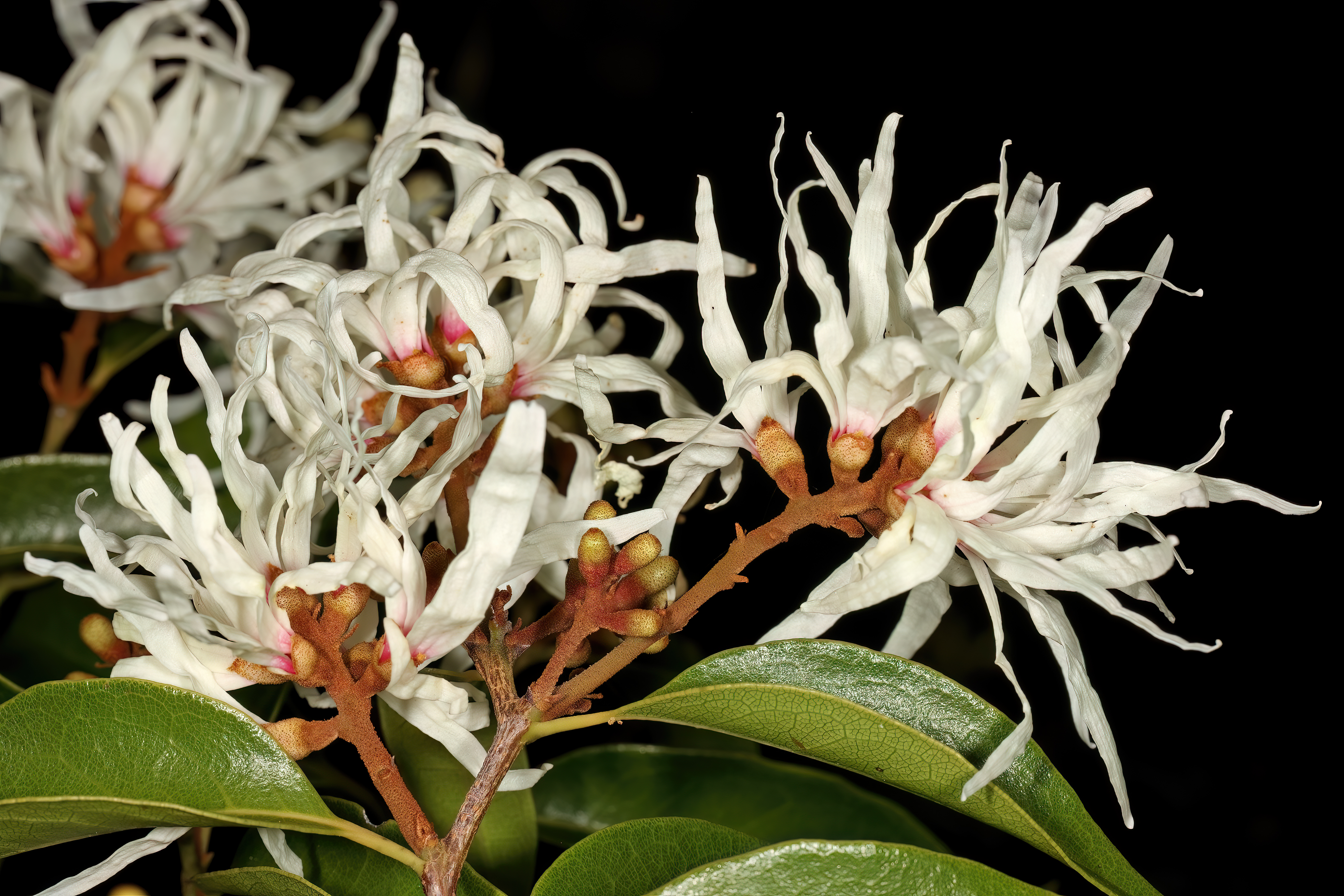
