= Wallaby-class water and fuel lighter =

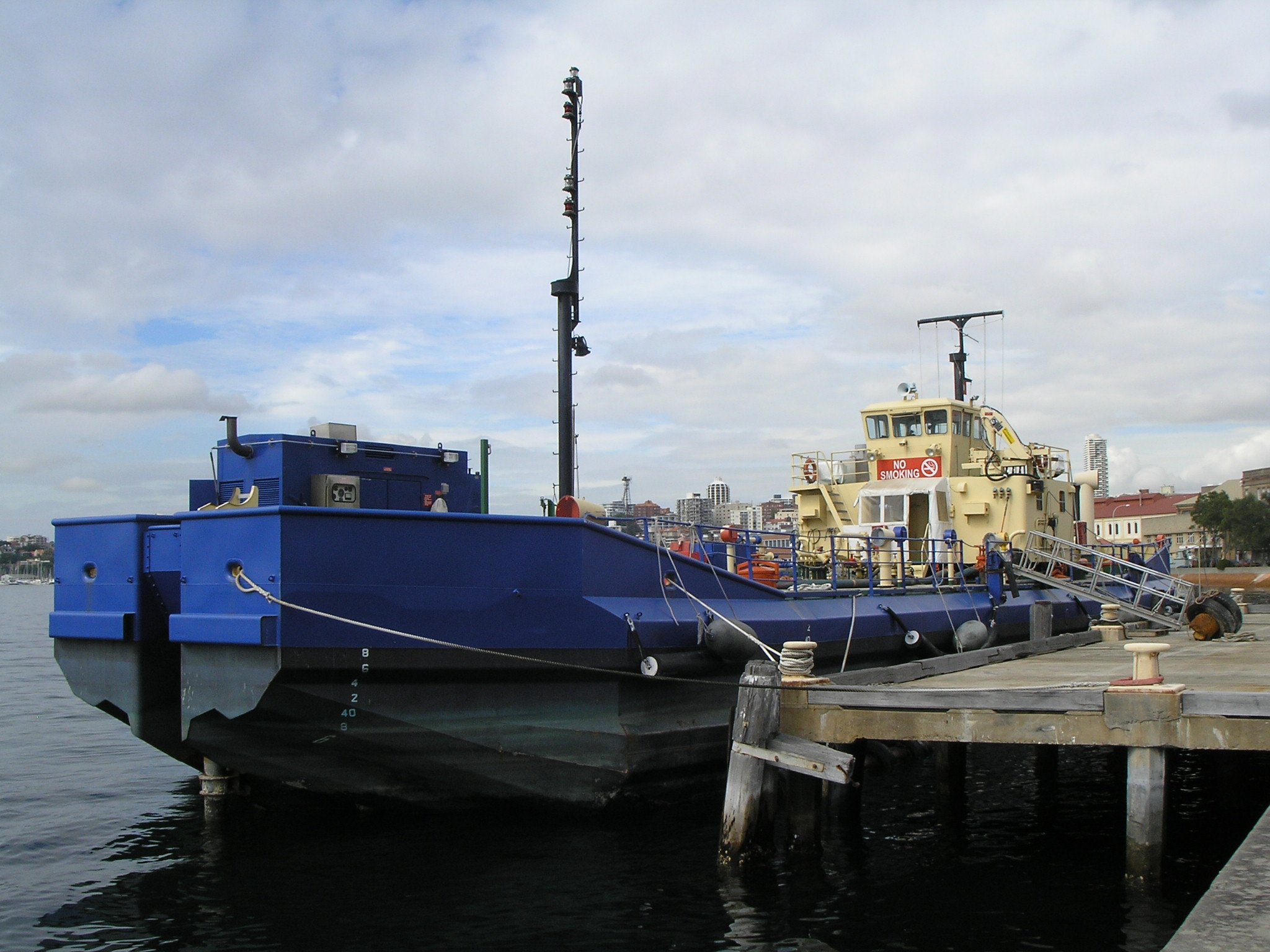
- A Wallaby-class lighter in 2008

Class overview
- Name: Wallaby-class water and fuel lighter
- Builders: Williamstown Naval Dockyard
- Operators: Royal Australian Navy; DMS Maritime
- Cost: $7,000,000
- Built: 1978-1984
- In service: 1981–2016
- Completed: 4
- Retired: 4

General characteristics
- Type: Lighter
- Displacement: 210 tons, 1100 tons (loaded)
- Length: 38 m (124 ft 8 in)
- Beam: 9.8 m (32 ft 2 in)
- Draft: 3.8 m (12 ft 6 in)
- Propulsion: 2 x G.E.C Harbourmaster Units
- Armament: None

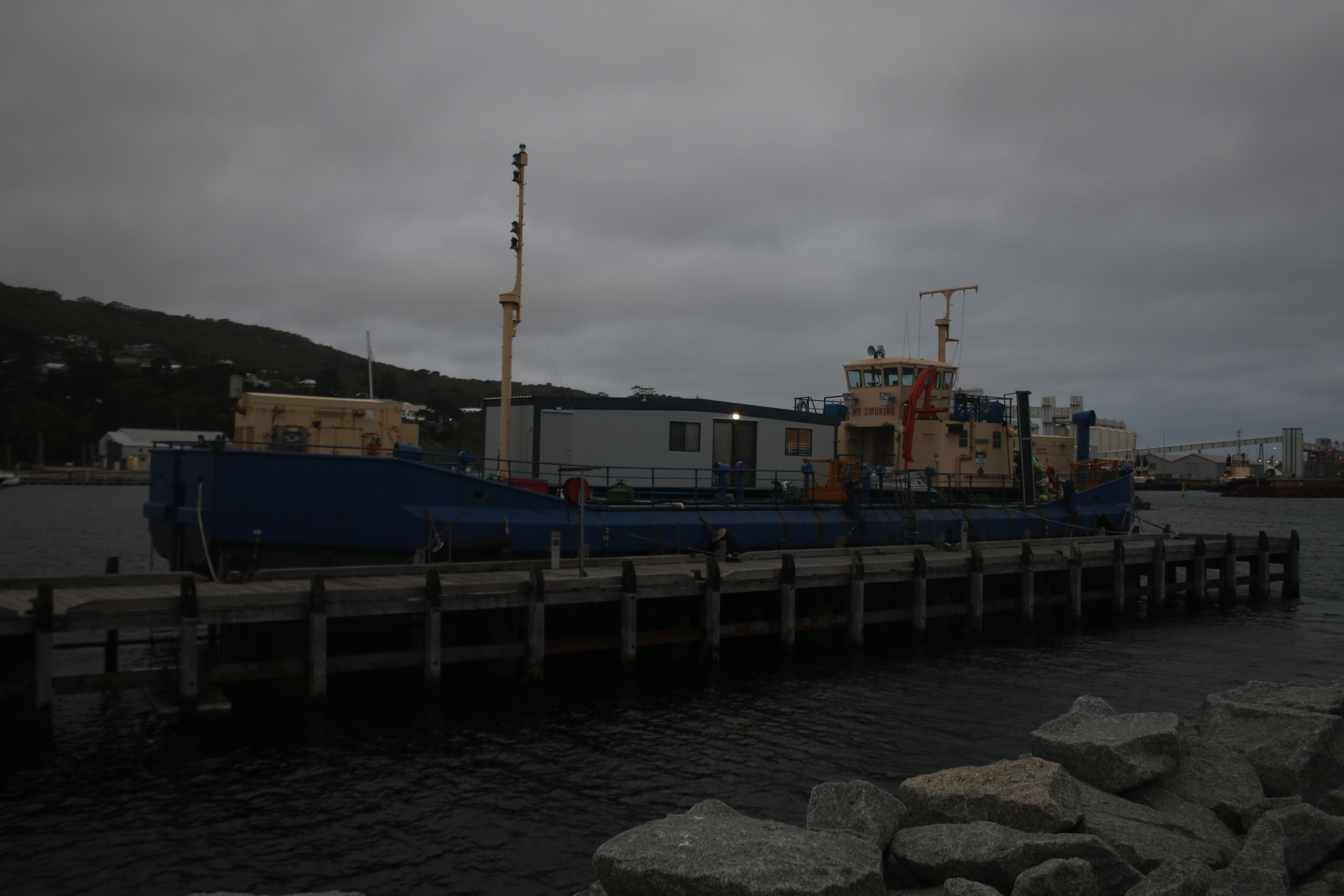
Wyulda, Princess Royal Harbour, port side bow end

The Wallaby-class water and fuel lighter is a class of four Australian-built lighters which have supported the Royal Australian Navy (RAN) since 1981. The vessels were originally operated by the RAN, but were transferred to DMS Maritime after 1997.

Their main role is to transport diesel fuel and desalinated water and remove sullage and ballast waters for the RAN, although they can also be used to control oil spills.

The Wallaby-class craft are scheduled to be disposed of over the next few years, with replacement water fuel lighters proposed by DMS Maritime. Update All Vessels have now been removed from service and are awaiting scrapping. Dec 2018

== Ships ==
| Name | Builder | Laid Down | Launched | Notes |
|---|---|---|---|---|
| Wallaby (8002) | Williamstown Dockyard | 1978 | 1983 | Based at Sydney - Removed 2016 |
| Wombat (8003) | Williamstown Dockyard | 1978 | 1983 | Based at Sydney - Removed 2016 |
| Wyulda (8004) | Williamstown Dockyard | 1982 | 1984 | Based at HMAS Stirling - Removed 2016 |
| Warrigal (8001) | Williamstown Dockyard | 1982 | 1984 | Based at Darwin - Removed 2016 |
