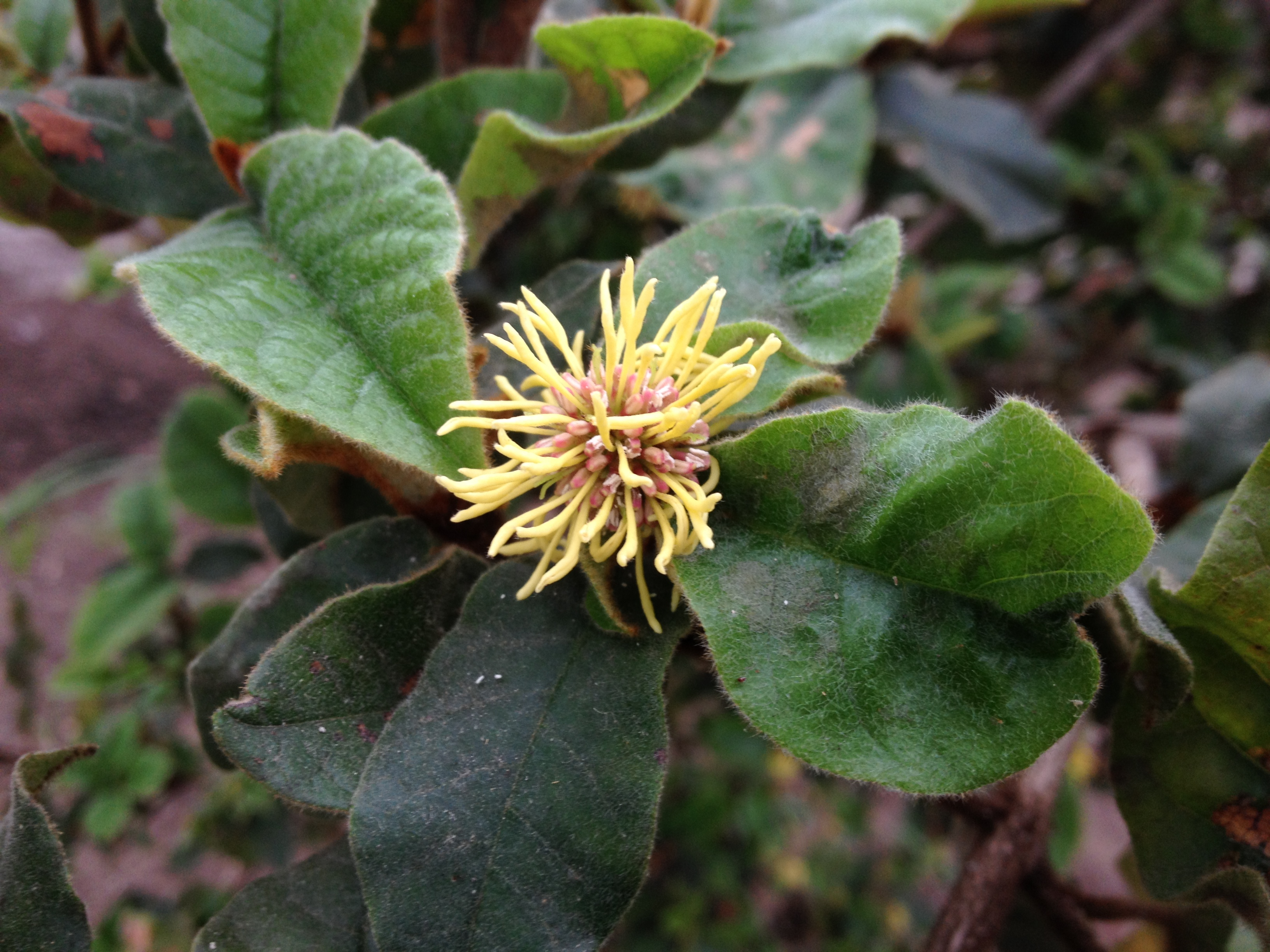
- Trichocladus crinitus

Scientific classification
- Kingdom: Plantae
- Clade: Tracheophytes
- Clade: Angiosperms
- Clade: Eudicots
- Order: Saxifragales
- Family: Hamamelidaceae
- Subfamily: Hamamelidoideae
- Tribe: Dicorypheae
- Genus: Trichocladus; Pers.

Synonyms
- Dahlia Thunb.

= Trichocladus =

Genus of shrubs

Trichocladus is a genus of flowering plants in the family Hamamelidaceae, consisting of shrubs or small trees. The distinguishing features of the genus Trichocladus are as follows:

- Branches and leaves are often covered in dense, velvet-like, stellate hairs.
- Leaves are simple, alternate or opposite, and paler beneath, with inconspicuous stipules.
- Flowers are borne in dense, spherical heads, with floral parts in 4s or 5s. Sepals are fused together, forming a tube. Petals are long and narrow. Trichocladus flowers closely resemble those of the genus Hamamelis and are hermaphroditic or sexually separate, with male and female parts being borne on different flowers, either on the same plant of different plants (either monoecious or dioecious).
- Fruits consist of a two-valved capsule which appears to be 4-valved at its apex.

== Species ==
Four species are accepted.

- Trichocladus crinitus (Thunb.) Pers.
- Trichocladus ellipticus Eckl. & Zeyh.
- Trichocladus goetzei Engl.
- Trichocladus grandiflorus Oliv.

== Distribution ==
Species range through eastern and Southern Africa from Ethiopia to Angola and South Africa, including South Africa and Zimbabwe.

== Etymology ==
Trichocladus is derived from Greek and means 'hairy-branched' (τριχός trichos, ‘hair’; κλάδος klados, ‘branch’).
