= HMAS Flinders (GS 312) =

Ship of the Royal Australian Navy

History

Australia
- Namesake: Matthew Flinders
- Builder: Williamstown Dockyard
- Laid down: February 1971
- Launched: 29 July 1972
- Commissioned: 27 April 1973
- Decommissioned: 1998
- Identification: IMO number: 1007914; MMSI number: 319075000; Callsign: ZCND5
- Motto: "Investigate"
- Fate: Sold into civilian service
- Badge

General characteristics
- Type: Hydrographic survey ship
- Displacement: 740 tons full load
- Length: 161 feet (49 m) length overall
- Beam: 33 feet (10 m)
- Draught: 12 feet (3.7 m)
- Propulsion: 2 × Paxman Ventura diesels; 2 screws
- Speed: 13.5 knots (25.0 km/h; 15.5 mph)
- Range: 5,000 nautical miles (9,300 km; 5,800 mi) at 9 knots (17 km/h; 10 mph)

HMAS Flinders (GS 312/A 312), named for Matthew Flinders (1774–1814), was a hydrographic survey ship of the Royal Australian Navy (RAN). Built by Williamstown Dockyard, Flinders was commissioned into the RAN in 1973, and was used to conduct hydrographic surveys in the waters to Australia's north, including parts of New Guinea. In 1974, the ship was tasked with assisting clean up efforts in the wake of Cyclone Tracy, which devastated large parts of Darwin. The ship was decommissioned in 1998 and sold to civilian operators, who have since converted her into a private yacht in the Cayman Islands.

== Construction and design ==
The ship was ordered in 1970 to replace the light survey vessel HMAS Paluma. Flinders was 161 feet (49 m) in length overall, with a beam of 33 feet (10 m), a draught of 12 feet (3.7 m), and a full load displacement of 740 tons. Propulsion was provided by two Paxman Ventura diesel motors connected to twin screws, providing a top speed of 13.5 knots (25.0 km/h; 15.5 mph) and a range of 5,000 nautical miles (9,300 km; 5,800 mi) at 9 knots (17 km/h; 10 mph). The hull was all-welded, and designed to Australian Shipping Board standards for coastal operations. Increased seakeeping ability was imparted through a bulbous bow, high forecastle, and a stabilising system. Most operations were intended to be in the waters of Australia and Papua New Guinea, although Flinders was also capable of limited oceanographic work. The ship's company consisted of 38 personnel, and Flinders carried light-calibre weapons for self-defence.

Flinders was laid down at Williamstown Dockyard, in February 1971. She was launched on 29 July 1972 and commissioned into the RAN on 27 April 1973. The ship cost $2.6 million.

== Operational history ==
On commissioning, the ship was based in Cairns, and afterwards was used to undertake hydrographic surveys to Australia's north. Following the destruction of Darwin by Cyclone Tracy during the night of 24–25 December 1974, Flinders was deployed as part of the relief effort; Operation Navy Help Darwin. She sailed from Cairns on 26 December, and as the first ship to arrive, Flinders was tasked with surveying the harbour to work out the position of wrecks and the safest areas for the other RAN ships to anchor. The majority of Flinders' survey work was undertaken off the Queensland coast, but in 1976 she undertook operations in the Dampier Strait, in New Guinea waters. From 1980 to 1983 she operated off the coasts of Queensland and Papua New Guinea under Commander James Bond. In 1982, Bond and Flinders discovered, surveyed and charted the Hydrographers Passage, providing a faster, more efficient route through the Great Barrier Reef for merchant shipping.

Flinders was decommissioned in 1998. In October 1999, the ship was sold at auction to a New Zealand consortium. She was remodelled into a private yacht, and now operates as MY Plan B, registered in the Cayman Islands.
