= James Bond (naval officer) =

Australian naval officer (1945 – 2016)

James Bond

Commander Graham James Bond (4 October 1945 – 8 April 2016) was an officer in the Royal Australian Navy. He was best known for having discovered and charted a new deep-water shipping channel through the Great Barrier Reef, the Hydrographers Passage, which was 250 miles shorter than the previous route.

== Early life ==
Graham James Bond was born in Adelaide, Australia, on 4 October 1945. He was only ever called Graham by his mother.

== Career ==
Bond was in charge of the survey ship HMAS Flinders, a Royal Australian Navy vessel, from 1980. He was responsible for surveying the coasts of Queensland and Papua New Guinea for the next three years.

In 1981, Bond discovered and charted the 60-mile-long Hydrographers Passage, a new deep-water shipping channel through the Great Barrier Reef, that reduced the previous route to take coal from the port of Hay Point to Asian markets by 250 miles. In 1985, Bond received the Royal Geographical Society's J P Thomson Foundation Gold Medal, for the discovery of Hydrographers Passage. Bond was promoted to the rank of Commander in 1986, and resigned from the Royal Australian Navy in 1988.

In 1993, Bond began working for the Australian Maritime Safety Authority (AMSA), specialising in navigation and ship safety, and international relations. On his retirement from AMSA in 2013, the CEO Mick Kinley said of Bond, "He was a well-liked and respected man who embodied the best of Australian maritime tradition".

== Personal life ==
In 1969, Bond married Linda Baxter, and they had two daughters and a son, Melanie, Sharon, and Jamie. The couple later separated. His children all survived him, as did his later partner, Robin.

He was known as "007", was invited to James Bond film premieres, and was happy to be photographed with strangers who would buy him drinks due to his name.

Bond died at his farm in Braidwood on 8 April 2016.
