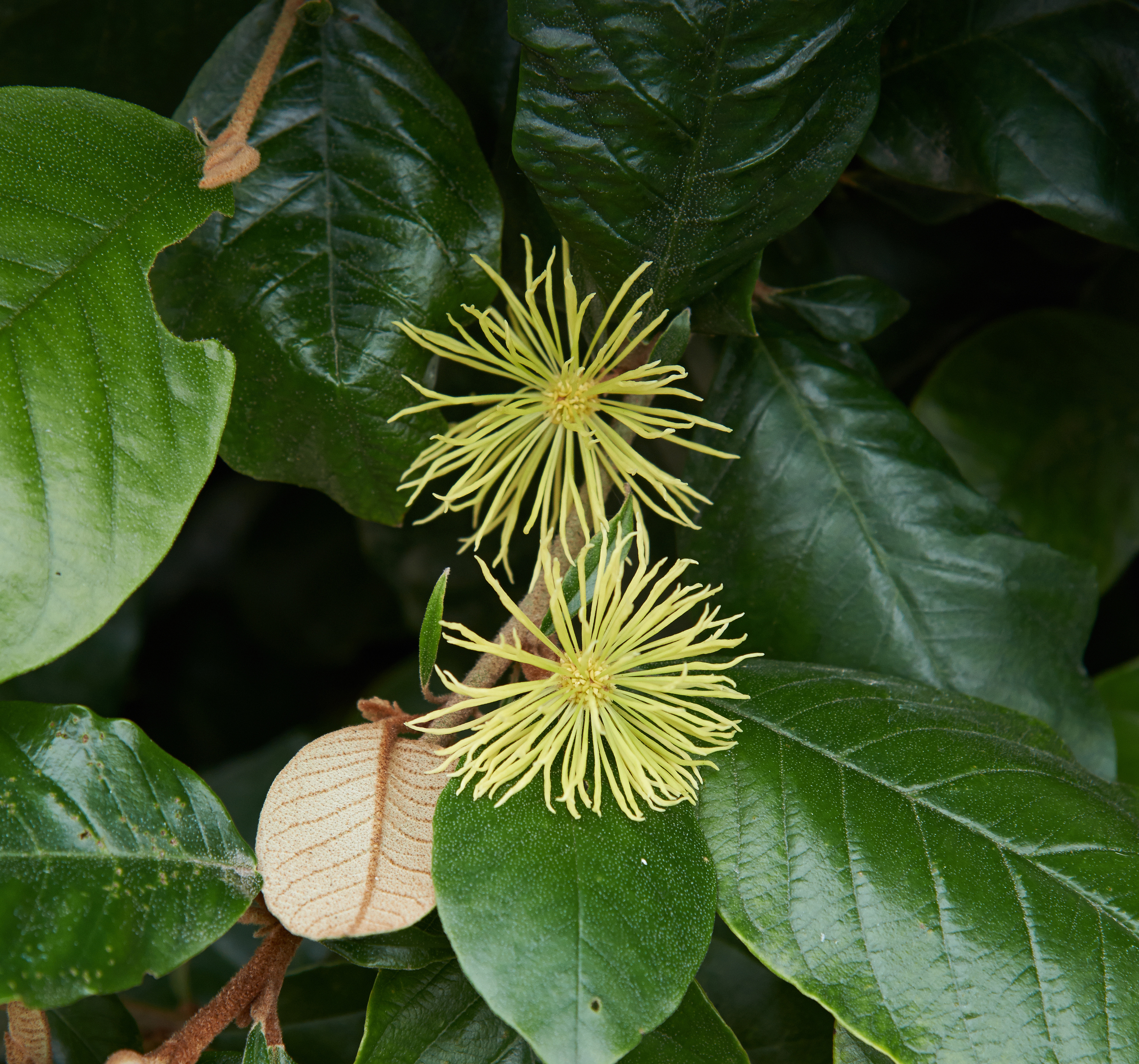

Scientific classification
- Kingdom: Plantae
- Clade: Tracheophytes
- Clade: Angiosperms
- Clade: Eudicots
- Order: Saxifragales
- Family: Hamamelidaceae
- Genus: Trichocladus
- Species: T. ellipticus

Binomial name
- Trichocladus ellipticus Eckl. & Zeyh.

= Trichocladus ellipticus =

Species of plant

Trichocladus ellipticus is a species in the genus Trichocladus, in the family Hamamelidaceae. It is also called white witch-hazel.

== Description and range ==
An evergreen, Trichocladus ellipticus ranges in size from a scrambling shrub to a small, many-branched tree to 10m, while the subspecies malosanus reaches up to 15m. It is native to South Africa, eastern Zimbabwe, and western Mozambique along the border with Zimbabwe, where it occurs in mist-belt forests, along streams and rivers, where it is often quite dominant, and in swampy areas.

Wood: White, hard, and tough, often with a black centre.

Bark: Young stems are covered by velvety brown hairs, maturing to greyish brown and hairless.

Leaves: Leaves are entire and are both alternate and spirally arranged, elliptic to lanceolate, with a pointed tip and slightly more rounded base. Adult leaves are dark, glossy green above with dense, rusty to cream coloured hairs beneath, and are normally 7 cm long, but can range from 5 cm to 15 cm in length, and 2.5-7.5 cm wide. Petiole is 0.5–2 cm long.

Flowers: Ranging in colour from yellowish green to cream, the spiky, ragged axillary or terminal heads are about 2 cm in diameter, and closely resemble Hamamelis in shape. Male and female parts are borne on separate flowers, either on the same specimen or different specimens (may be either monoecious or dioecious). Flowers from September to December.

Fruit: Small, velvety, almost spherical 5x6cm capsules which split into 2 valves, each of which itself splits into two. Fruits are borne between December and February.

== Subspecies ==
Trichocladus ellipticus subsp. ellipticus: Endemic to South Africa and has smaller, narrower leaves with an attenuate apex. Trichocladus ellipticus subsp. malosanus: Occurs in Zimbabwe and adjacent Mozambique, and has noticeably larger, broader leaves with a slightly rounded apex.

== Cultivation ==
Grows well in cool (temperate) greenhouses. Compost and care similar to that of Gardenia.

== Etymology ==
Trichocladus is derived from Greek and means 'hairy-branched' (τριχός trichos, ‘hair’; κλάδος klados, ‘branch’), while ellipticus, also derived from Greek (ελλειπτικός), means ‘about twice as long as broad, oblong with rounded ends, elliptic’.
