= HMAS Shepparton (J248) =

1942 Bathurst-class corvette

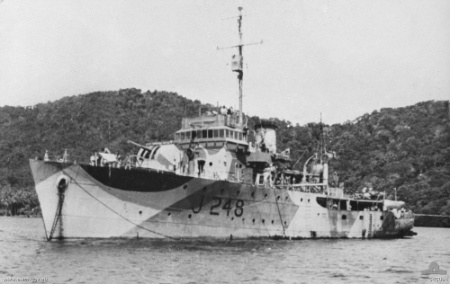
- HMAS Shepparton

History

Australia
- Namesake: City of Shepparton, Victoria
- Builder: HMA Naval Dockyard at Williamstown, Victoria
- Laid down: 14 November 1941
- Launched: 15 August 1942
- Commissioned: 1 February 1943
- Decommissioned: 10 May 1946
- Motto: "By Wisdom And Courage"
- Honours and awards: Battle honours: Pacific 1943; New Guinea 1943–44
- Fate: Scrapped in 1958
- Badge

General characteristics
- Class & type: Bathurst-class corvette
- Displacement: 650 tons (standard), 1,025 tons (full war load)
- Length: 186 ft (57 m)
- Beam: 31 ft (9.4 m)
- Draught: 8.5 ft (2.6 m)
- Propulsion: triple expansion engine, 2 shafts, 1,800 horsepower
- Speed: 15 knots (28 km/h; 17 mph) at 1,750 hp
- Complement: 81
- Armament: 1 × 4 inch Mk XVI gun; 4 × Oerlikon 20 mm cannons (1 later removed); 1 × Bofors 40 mm L/60 gun (installed later); Machine guns; Depth charges chutes and throwers

HMAS Shepparton (J248/M248), named for the city of Shepparton, Victoria, was one of 60 Bathurst-class corvettes constructed during World War II, and one of 36 initially manned and commissioned solely by the Royal Australian Navy (RAN). Commissioned in early 1943, Shepparton was primarily employed as a survey vessel, tasked with updating Age of Sail-era charts and data for regions of New Guinea. The corvette was placed in reserve in 1946, and sold for scrap in 1958.

== Design and construction ==
In 1938, the Australian Commonwealth Naval Board (ACNB) identified the need for a general purpose 'local defence vessel' capable of both anti-submarine and mine-warfare duties, while easy to construct and operate. The vessel was initially envisaged as having a displacement of approximately 500 tons, a speed of at least 10 knots (19 km/h; 12 mph), and a range of 2,000 nautical miles (3,700 km; 2,300 mi) The opportunity to build a prototype in the place of a cancelled Bar-class boom defence vessel saw the proposed design increased to a 680-ton vessel, with a 15.5 knots (28.7 km/h; 17.8 mph) top speed, and a range of 2,850 nautical miles (5,280 km; 3,280 mi), armed with a 4-inch gun, equipped with asdic, and able to fitted with either depth charges or minesweeping equipment depending on the planned operations: although closer in size to a sloop than a local defence vessel, the resulting increased capabilities were accepted due to advantages over British-designed mine warfare and anti-submarine vessels. Construction of the prototype HMAS Kangaroo did not go ahead, but the plans were retained. The need for locally built 'all-rounder' vessels at the start of World War II saw the "Australian Minesweepers" (designated as such to hide their anti-submarine capability, but popularly referred to as "corvettes") approved in September 1939, with 60 constructed during the course of the war: 36 (including Shepparton) ordered by the RAN, 20 ordered by the British Admiralty but manned and commissioned as RAN vessels, and 4 for the Royal Indian Navy.

Shepparton was laid down on 14 November 1941 by HMA Naval Dockyard at Williamstown, Victoria, launched on 15 August 1942 by Lady Goudle, wife of the Victorian Commissioner of Public Works, and commissioned into the RAN on 1 February 1943.

== Operational history ==
Shepparton entered operational service in April 1943, and was primarily employed as an armed survey ship. Shepparton served in New Guinea and New Britain between April 1943 and October 1944, and in the waters of northern Australian until 1 February 1945, at which point she went to Brisbane for refitting. The refit concluded on 2 April 1945, with Shepparton assigned to various areas in northern Australia and the islands of New Guinea, before returning to Brisbane on 21 October 1945.

The corvette received two battle honours for her wartime service: "Pacific 1943" and "New Guinea 1943–44". During the war, Shepparton sailed just over 50,000 nautical miles (93,000 km; 58,000 mi) during 5,072 hours spend underway. The last surveys of many regions of New Guinea and the Solomon Islands had been performed during the Age of Sail, and were woefully inaccurate by modern standards. The accomplishments of Shepparton and other survey ships during the Pacific campaigns generated a wealth of survey and hydrographic data, with one author claiming shortly after the war's end that these areas "are better mapped than the greater part of the Australian mainland, or for that matter, better than many parts of the world which were outside the operative zones of the war."

== Fate ==
Shepparton paid off to reserve on 10 May 1946. She was towed to Sydney by sister ship HMAS Deloraine in early November 1947, where she remained until her sale for scrap on 20 February 1958. Shepparton was sold to the Mitsubishi Shoji Kaisha company, and was towed to Japan by the Shitako Maru.
