= Blade the Warrior =

1984 video game

- Publisher(s): Cable Software
- Designer(s): Shaun Watts
- Engine: The Quill
- Platform(s): ZX Spectrum
- Release: 1984
- Genre(s): Interactive fiction
- Mode(s): Single-player

Blade the Warrior is a text adventure game written by British author Shaun Watts and published by Cable Software in 1984 for the ZX Spectrum. The fantasy themed game tells of a quest to slay an evil witch. It was Cable's first title to be released and was well received upon its release.

== Plot ==
The game is set in a sword and sorcery setting, where the titular protagonist Blade the Warrior embarks on a quest to destroy the evil Black Witch and thus liberate the far-north land of Sayell that she rules over. Blade needs to follow the trail of Mazar the Wizard, who went on the same mission many months ago and did not return. Along the way, Blade fights against the Black Witch's monstrous minions while looking for enough magic to survive the witch's spells and defeat her, and hopefully save Mazar too.

== Reception ==
Blade the Warrior was well received, including a review scores of five out of five stars from Home Computing Weekly and 7/10 from Crash. Home Computing Weekly gave it its "1984 Hi-Score" award in the category "Best Adventure".
