= HMAS Castlemaine =

1940s Bathurst-class corvette

Coordinates: 37.8611°S 144.9056°E

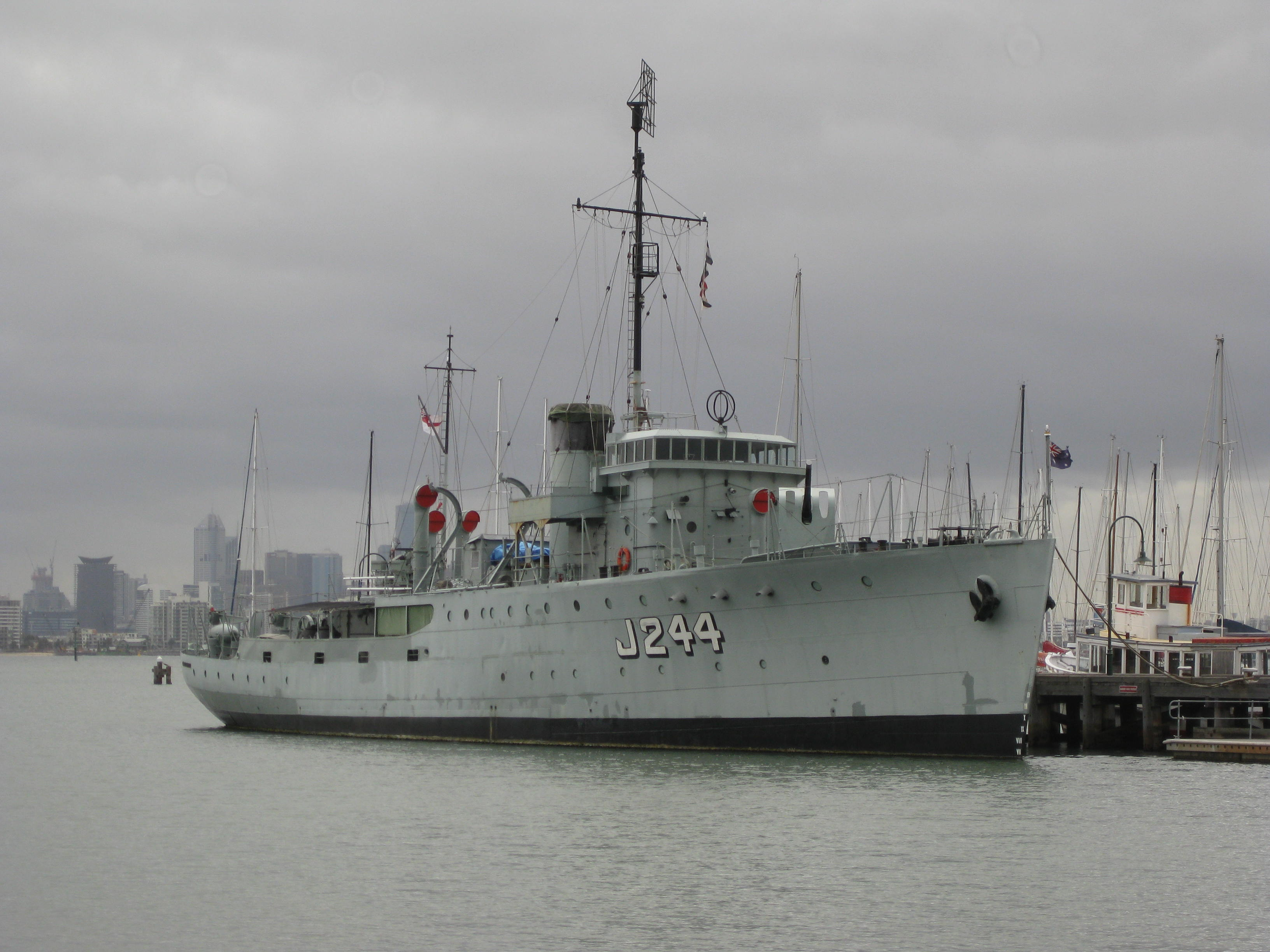
- HMAS Castlemaine

History

Australia
- Namesake: City of Castlemaine, Victoria
- Builder: HMA Naval Dockyard in Williamstown, Victoria
- Laid down: 17 February 1941
- Launched: 7 August 1941
- Commissioned: 17 June 1942
- Decommissioned: 14 December 1945
- Reclassified: Immobilised training hulk (1945); Museum ship (1973)
- Motto: "Watch and Prey"
- Honours and awards: Battle honours: Darwin 1942–43; Pacific 1942–43; New Guinea 1942–44
- Status: Preserved as a museum ship in Williamstown, Victoria
- Badge

General characteristics
- Class & type: Bathurst-class corvette
- Displacement: 650 tons (standard), 1,025 tons (full war load)
- Length: 186 ft (57 m)
- Beam: 31 ft (9.4 m)
- Draught: 8.5 ft (2.6 m)
- Propulsion: triple expansion engine, 2 shafts. 2,000 hp
- Speed: 15.5 knots (28.7 km/h; 17.8 mph)
- Complement: 85
- Armament: 1 × QF 4-inch (102 mm) gun Mk XIX; 1 x Bofors 40 mm L/60 gun; 3 × 20 mm Oerlikon anti-aircraft guns; 2 × 0.5-inch machine guns; Depth charges chutes and throwers

HMAS Castlemaine (J244/M244/A248), named for the city of Castlemaine, Victoria, was one of 60 Bathurst-class corvettes constructed during World War II, and one of 36 initially crewed and commissioned solely by the Royal Australian Navy (RAN).

Launched in 1941 and commissioned in 1942, Castlemaine operated during World War II in the waters of Australia, New Guinea, and Timor. She remained in service until 1945, when she was decommissioned into reserve and converted into an immobilised training ship. In 1973, Castlemaine was presented to the Maritime Trust of Australia for conversion to a museum ship. She is one of two surviving examples of the Bathurst class, the other being HMAS Whyalla.

== Design and construction ==
In 1938, the Australian Commonwealth Naval Board (ACNB) identified the need for a general purpose 'local defence vessel' capable of both anti-submarine and mine-warfare duties, while easy to construct and operate. The vessel was initially envisaged as having a displacement of approximately 500 tons, a speed of at least 10 knots (19 km/h; 12 mph), and a range of 2,000 nautical miles (3,700 km; 2,300 mi). The opportunity to build a prototype in the place of a cancelled Bar-class boom defence vessel saw the proposed design increased to a 680-ton vessel, with a 15.5 knots (28.7 km/h; 17.8 mph) top speed, and a range of 2,850 nautical miles (5,280 km; 3,280 mi), equipped with asdic, and able to fitted with either depth charges or minesweeping equipment depending on the planned operations: although closer in size to a sloop than a local defence vessel, the resulting increased capabilities were accepted due to advantages over British-designed mine warfare and anti-submarine vessels. Main armament was initially a BL 4-inch Mk IX naval gun on a Mk I mounting, but this was replaced in 1943 by a QF 4-inch Mk XIX gun on a Mk XXIII mounting.

Construction of the prototype HMAS Kangaroo did not go ahead, but the plans were retained. The need for locally built 'all-rounder' vessels at the start of World War II saw the "Australian Minesweepers" (designated as such to hide their anti-submarine capability, but popularly referred to as "corvettes") approved in September 1939, with 60 constructed during the course of the war: 36 (including Castlemaine) ordered by the RAN, 20 ordered by the British Admiralty but crewed and commissioned as RAN vessels, and 4 for the Royal Indian Navy.

Castlemaine was laid down by HMA Naval Dockyard in Williamstown, Victoria on 17 February 1941. She was launched on 7 August 1941 by Dame Pattie Menzies, wife of the then Prime Minister of Australia, Sir Robert Menzies. The corvette was commissioned into the RAN at Melbourne on 17 June 1942.

== Operational history ==
After commissioning, Castlemaine sailed to Sydney, where she was involved in training exercises and convoy escort along the east coast of Australia. On the night of 11 August 1942, the corvette collided with a Manly ferry, requiring a week of repairs at Cockatoo Island Dockyard.

After repairs, Castlemaine was ordered to Townsville, then assigned to Darwin in October: at both locations the ship was tasked with supporting and supplying Allied guerrilla operations in Timor. In late November 1942, the RAN was called on to evacuate the commandoes of the 2/2nd Independent Company (an evacuation attempt in September failed when the destroyer HMAS Voyager grounded and was scuttled after being badly damaged by attacking Japanese aircraft), a contingent of Dutch troops, and over 100 Portuguese civilians, while delivering a relief contingent. Castlemaine, sister ship Armidale, and the auxiliary patrol boat Kuru were assigned to the operation by Commodore Cuthbert Pope, Naval Officer in Charge Darwin, with Castlemaine the commanding ship. The plan was for Kuru to reach Betano Bay early on the night of 30 November, offload supplies, and take on the civilians. The two corvettes were to arrive two hours later; Kuru would deliver her passengers to Castlemaine, which was to head for Darwin at first opportunity, then shuttle relief troops aboard Armidale to shore while evacuating the soldiers.

The corvettes sailed from Darwin at midday on 29 November, leaving just as Japanese aircraft flew over the harbour. At 09:00 on 30 November, the two ships were located by a Japanese reconnaissance plane, but were unable to shoot it down. Because of the likelihood of attack during the day and the distance from the destination, the ships radioed Darwin and suggested that the mission be aborted, but Pope instructed they were to continue after steering away from their intended destination for an hour, and promised fighter support. Armidale and Castlemaine were attacked at midday by 14 Japanese bombers, but these were driven off by a force of Bristol Beaufighters, which then returned to Australia. Another attack came at 14:00, but neither side was able to do damage. Delays from the evasive course and two air attacks meant the corvettes reached Betano Bay after 02:30 on 1 December, with no sign of Kuru, and retreated to sea. Kuru was sighted at daybreak-assuming the corvettes were not coming, her commander chose to sail for Darwin with the civilians-and the civilians were transferred to Castlemaine. Although as senior ship, Castlemaine's commanding officer felt he should return to Betano Bay with the soldiers, the troops were aboard the other corvette, and at 11:00 he ordered (with Commodore Pope's approval) Armidale and Kuru to return by separate routes and attempt the operation again that night. Although Castlemaine returned without trouble, Armidale was attacked and sunk by Japanese aircraft on 1 December.

On 15 December, Castlemaine was escorting the merchant ships Period and James Cook to Thursday Island when they were attacked by Japanese aircraft. Four of Period's crew were killed, and the three ships were attacked two more times on 15 December, and a fourth time on 16 December. No further damage was sustained, with the aircraft driven off by the corvette's anti-aircraft armament on all four occasions.

Castlemaine (rear) with HMAS Benalla (right) and HMAS Sleuth (left) off Darwin in 1944.

Following the Allied withdrawal from Timor in early 1943, Castlemaine was assigned to minesweeping and escort duties in northern Australian waters. This continued until the end of 1943, when she was reassigned to the convoy escort role between Queensland and New Guinea. In August 1944, the corvette was tasked with survey duties in Australia waters, before sailing to Hong Kong for the Japanese surrender in September 1945.

The ship was granted three battle honours for her wartime service: "Darwin 1942–43", "Pacific 1942–43", and "New Guinea 1942–44".

== Decommissioning and preservation ==
Castlemaine paid off to reserve on 14 December 1945. She was immobilised at HMAS Cerberus at Crib Point in Victoria as a training hulk for Engine Room Artificers, who ran the boilers in part providing steam heating throughout the base. During this period, she was also used for damage control training for service personnel.

In September 1973, Castlemaine was presented as a gift to Maritime Trust of Australia from the Australian Government. Transferred into Trust ownership by the end of 1973, minus most of the original fittings, Castlemaine was restored and converted into a museum ship. Castlemaine is presently berthed at Gem Pier, Williamstown, Victoria, adjacent to the historic Customs House. The ship is not capable of sailing, as the main mess deck houses a museum, and the engines have been converted to run on compressed air, displaying their mechanical operation to visitors.

Between 14 and 29 August 2015, Castlemaine was drydocked for maintenance, cleaning, and hull preservation at the nearby BAE Systems Williamstown shipyard.
