= HMAS Kooronga =

History

Australia
- Name: Kooronga (1917-1924); Cerberus II (1924-??); Kooronga (??-1948)
- Builder: Williamstown Dockyard, Victoria.
- Launched: 1917
- Commissioned: 1924
- Decommissioned: 1948
- Fate: Sold in 1948

History

Australia
- Name: Black Witch II (1948-1958)
- Owner: Jim Anderson
- Fate: Ran aground and wrecked in 1958

General characteristics
- Type: Tug
- Displacement: 60 tons
- Length: 70 feet (21 m)
- Beam: 14 feet (4.3 m)

HMAS Kooronga was a 60-ton tug boat and training ship operated by the Royal Australian Navy (RAN). She was constructed at the Williamstown Dockyard, Victoria in 1917. Kooronga was commissioned on 6 June 1924 and named Cerberus II as a tender at the Flinders Naval Depot. The vessel was later renamed HMAS Kooronga. She ran aground in the Port Phillip channel and was stranded from 28 June until 14 July 1940. Upon being refloated she was refitted out.

Kooronga remained in RAN service until 1947. She was sold into private hands in 1948, renamed Black Witch II, and converted to a schooner. On 14 August 1958, the schooner ran aground at Apollo Bay beach during a gale. The wreck is believed to be buried under the sand.
