= Gem Pier =

Coordinates: 37.8615°S 144.9056°E

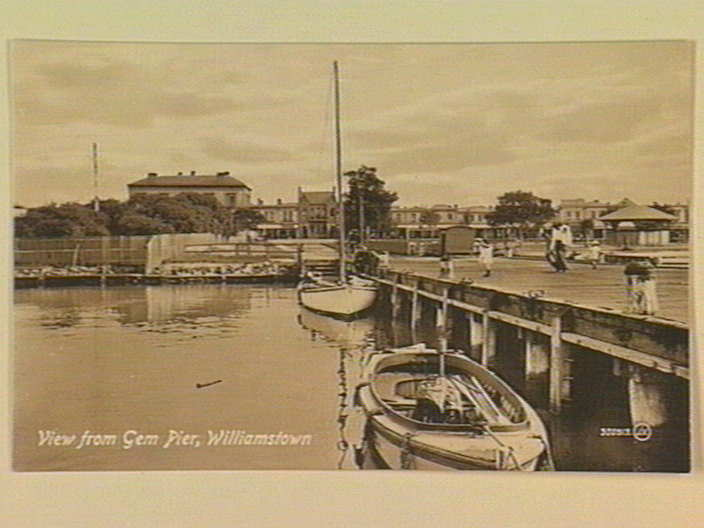
View of Williamstown from Gem Pier

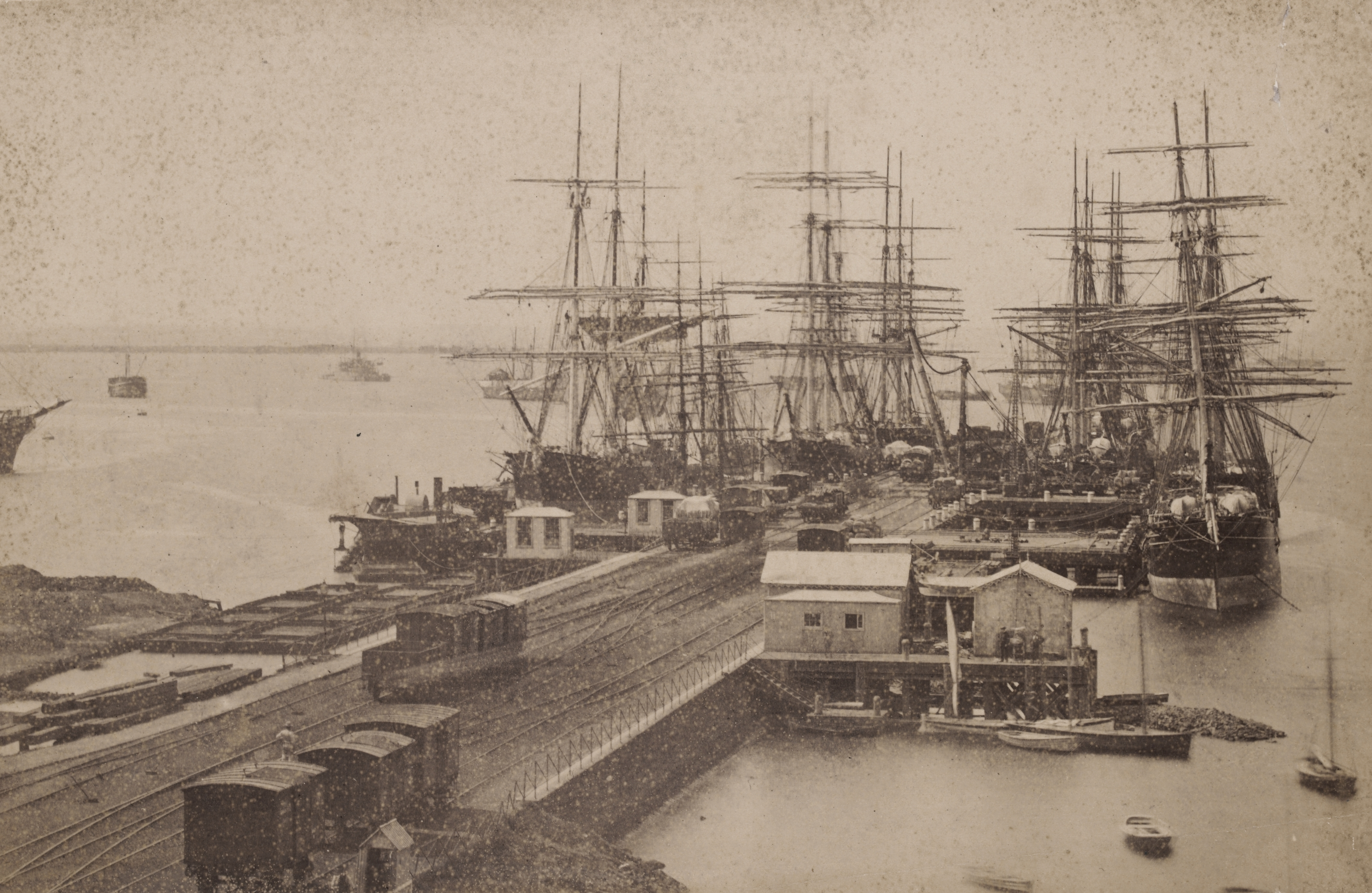
rightRailway pier at Williamstown

Gem Pier is an historic pier on Port Phillip Bay, in Williamstown, Victoria, Australia. The pier is 145 metres (476 ft) in length and is currently home to the museum ship HMAS Castlemaine and Melbourne Seaplanes.

== History ==
The first pier was built in 1839 near the present-day Gem Pier. Originally known as "The Jetty", in 1853 it was renamed "Old Pier" following the construction of the "New Pier" (the Ann Street Pier). Throughout the 1860s and 1870s it was known as "Steamboat Pier". In the 1870s it was renamed "Gem Pier" after the paddle steamer Gem that ran a ferry service from Williamstown to Port Melbourne from 1846 to 1886.

The pier was rebuilt in 1992.
