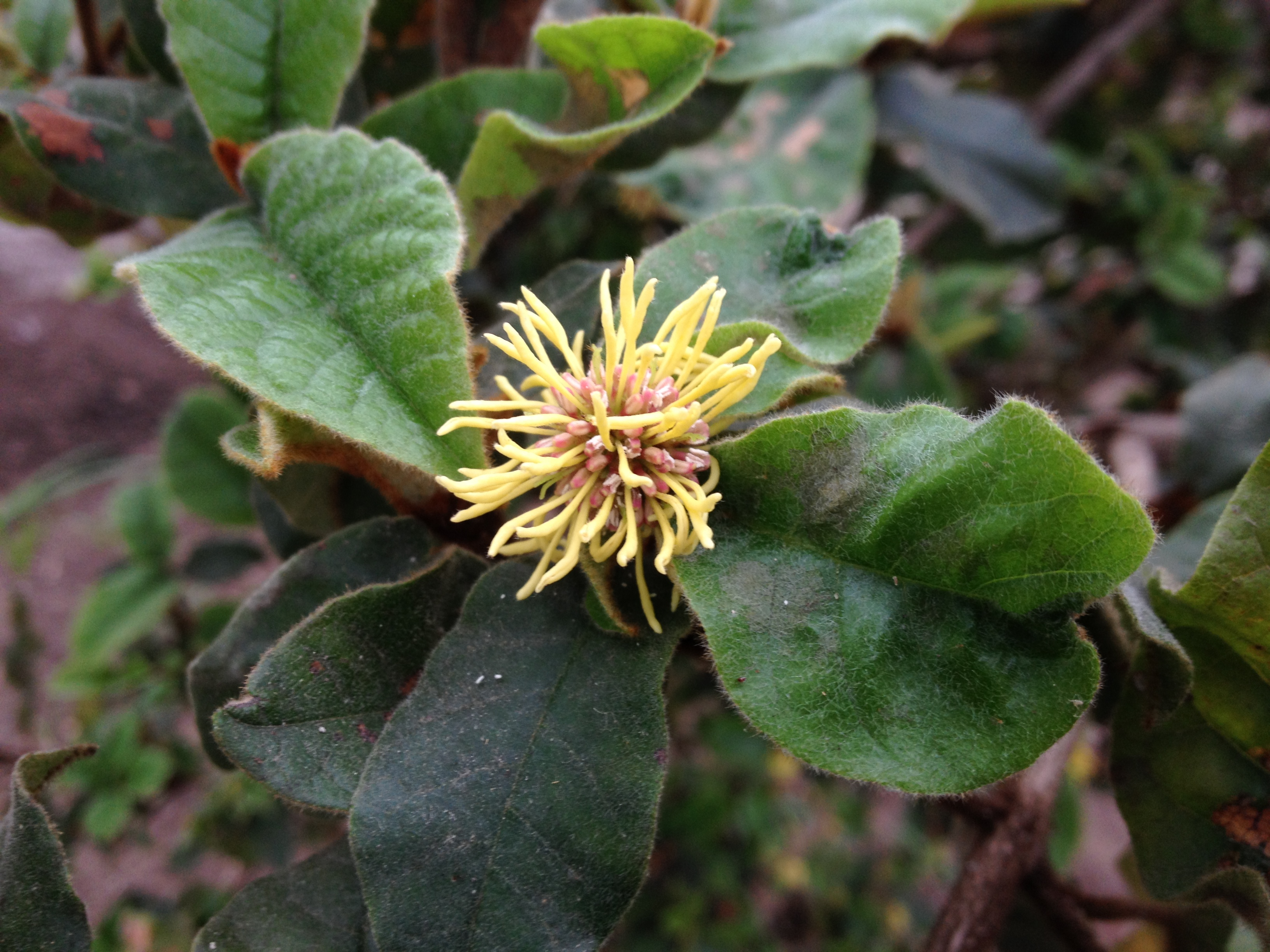
- Trichocladus crinitus leaves and flower at Kew Gardens

Scientific classification
- Kingdom: Plantae
- Clade: Tracheophytes
- Clade: Angiosperms
- Clade: Eudicots
- Order: Saxifragales
- Family: Hamamelidaceae
- Genus: Trichocladus
- Species: T. crinitus

Binomial name
- Trichocladus crinitus (Thunb.) Pers.

Synonyms
- Trichocladus ecklonianus C.Presl; Trichocladus peltatus Meisn.

= Trichocladus crinitus =

Species of flowering plant

Trichocladus crinitus is a species of the genus Trichocladus, in the family Hamamelidaceae. It is also called black witch-hazel.

== Description and range ==
Ranging in size from subshrub, shrub, to small tree 3–4 m in height, Trichocladus crinitus is often found growing in the understory of evergreen forests along the Garden Route in South Africa, where it is endemic.

Leaves: Its leaves, which grow opposite one another, are elliptic, with a tapering apex and slightly lobed or square base. They are a dark, shiny green above with dark brown velvety hairs beneath, particularly along the midrib. Adult leaves tend to be between 2.5 cm and 10 cm in length, and 1.5–7 cm wide, though they may occasionally grow slightly larger. Short, thick petiole is peltate.

Bark: Deep brown to pale grey and smooth.

Wood: White in colour and very hard.

Flowers: Range in colour from green to yellow or orange, and closely resemble Hamamelis in shape. Male and female parts are borne on separate flowers, either on the same specimen or different specimens (may be either monoecious or dioecious). Flowers from April to August.

Fruit: Small, hairy capsules are borne in clusters and range in colour from red to brown, depending upon their stage of ripeness. Fruits are typically between 5 and 7mm in length, and ripen between October and November.

== Cultivation ==
Grows well in cool (temperate) greenhouses. Compost and care similar to that of Gardenia.

== Etymology ==
Trichocladus is derived from Greek and means 'hairy-branched', while crinitus comes from Latin and means 'with a long tuft of fine hairs.'
