= TRV =

TRV can refer to:

- Technical remote viewing, in parapsychology
- Thermostatic radiator valve
- Transient recovery voltage
- The IATA airport code for Thiruvananthapuram International Airport
- Tobacco rattle virus
- New York Stock Exchange symbol for The Travelers Companies
- Trenner Verzeichnis (written “TrV”), a catalogue for the works of Richard Strauss, created by Franz Trenner
- Seediq language of northern Taiwan (ISO 639 code: trv)
- Torpedo recovery vessel
  - TRV Tailor (803)
  - TRV Trevally (802)
  - TRV Tuna (801)
