= HMAS Australia (1911) =

Indefatigable-class battlecruiser

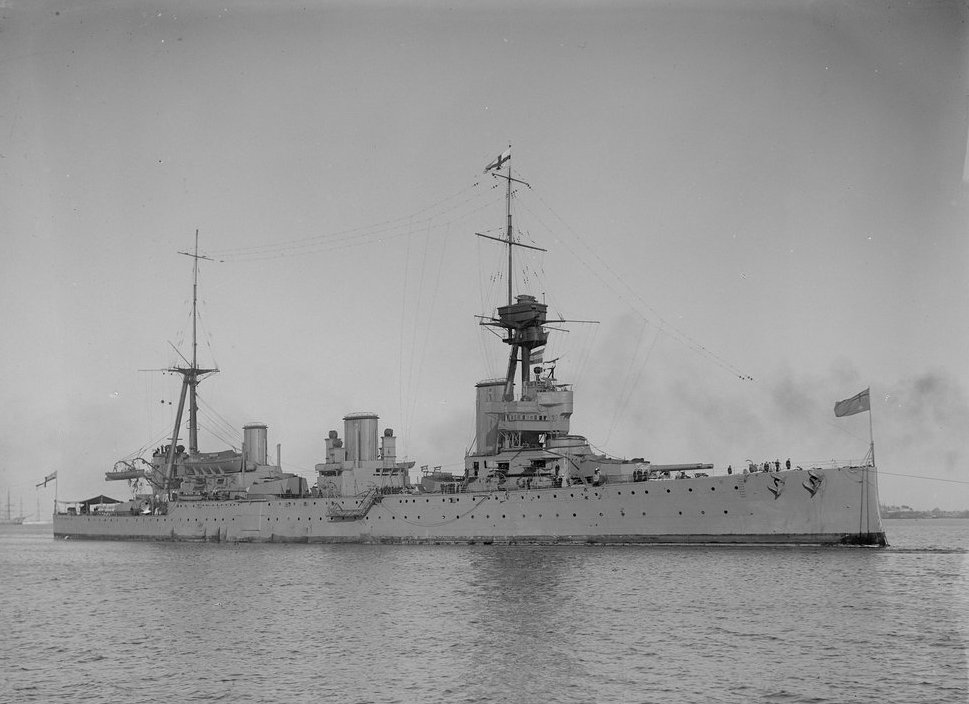
- HMAS Australia, 1914

History

Australia
- Name: Australia
- Namesake: Commonwealth of Australia
- Ordered: 9 December 1909
- Builder: John Brown & Company, Clydebank
- Yard number: 402
- Laid down: 26 June 1910
- Launched: 25 October 1911
- Commissioned: 21 June 1913
- Decommissioned: 12 December 1921
- Identification: Pennant numbers: C6 / 09 / 81
- Motto: "Endeavour"
- Honours and awards: Battle honours: Rabaul 1914; North Sea 1915–18
- Fate: Scuttled, 12 April 1924
- Badge

General characteristics
- Class & type: Indefatigable-class battlecruiser
- Displacement: 18,500 long tons (18,800 t) at load; 22,130 long tons (22,490 t) at deep load
- Length: 590 ft (179.8 m)
- Beam: 80 ft (24.4 m)
- Draught: 30 ft 4 in (9.2 m) at maximum
- Installed power: 44,000 shp (32,811 kW); 31 Babcock & Wilcox boilers
- Propulsion: 4 shafts; 2 steam turbine sets
- Speed: 25 knots (46 km/h; 29 mph)
- Range: 6,690 nautical miles (12,390 km; 7,700 mi) at 10 knots (19 km/h; 12 mph)
- Complement: 818 (1913)
- Armament: 4 × twin BL 12-inch Mk X guns; 16 × single BL 4-inch Mk VII guns; 2 × 18-inch torpedo tubes
- Armour: Belt: 4–6 in (102–152 mm); Decks: 1.5–2.5 in (38–64 mm); Barbettes: 7 in (178 mm); Turrets: 7 in (178 mm)

HMAS Australia was one of three Indefatigable-class battlecruisers built for the defence of the British Empire. Ordered by the Australian government in 1909, she was launched in 1911, and commissioned as flagship of the fledgling Royal Australian Navy (RAN) in 1913. Australia was the only capital ship to serve in the RAN. (Note: The Royal Australian Navy claims that Australia was the only capital ship to serve in the RAN. However, some sources also define the light aircraft carriers Sydney, Vengeance, and Melbourne as capital ships, and one (Cassells' The Capital Ships) also includes heavy and light cruisers, a destroyer tender, and a seaplane carrier in this definition.)

At the start of World War I, Australia was tasked with finding and destroying the German East Asia Squadron, which was prompted to withdraw from the Pacific by the battlecruiser's presence. Repeated diversions to support the capture of German colonies in New Guinea and Samoa, as well as an overcautious Admiralty, prevented the battlecruiser from engaging the German squadron before the squadron's destruction. Australia was then assigned to North Sea operations, which consisted primarily of patrols and exercises, until the end of the war. During this time, Australia was involved in early attempts at naval aviation, and 11 of her personnel participated in the Zeebrugge Raid. The battlecruiser was not at the Battle of Jutland, as she was undergoing repairs following a collision with sister ship HMS New Zealand. Australia fired in anger twice: at a German merchant vessel in January 1915, and at a suspected submarine contact in December 1917.

On her return to Australian waters, several sailors aboard the warship mutinied after a request for an extra day's leave in Fremantle was denied, although other issues played a part in the mutiny, including minimal leave during the war, problems with pay, and the perception that Royal Navy personnel were more likely to receive promotions than Australian sailors. Post-war budget cuts saw Australia's role downgraded to a training ship before she was placed in reserve in 1921. The disarmament provisions of the Washington Naval Treaty required the destruction of Australia as part of the British Empire's commitment, and she was scuttled off Sydney Heads in 1924.

== Design ==
The Indefatigable class of battlecruisers were based heavily on the preceding Invincible class. The main difference was that the Indefatigable's design was enlarged to give the ships' two wing turrets a wider arc of fire. As a result, the Indefatigable class was not a significant improvement on the Invincible design; the ships were smaller and not as well protected as the contemporary German battlecruiser SMS Von der Tann and subsequent German designs. While Von der Tann's characteristics were not known when the lead ship of the class, HMS Indefatigable, was laid down in February 1909, the Royal Navy obtained accurate information on the German ship before work began on Australia and her sister ship HMS New Zealand.

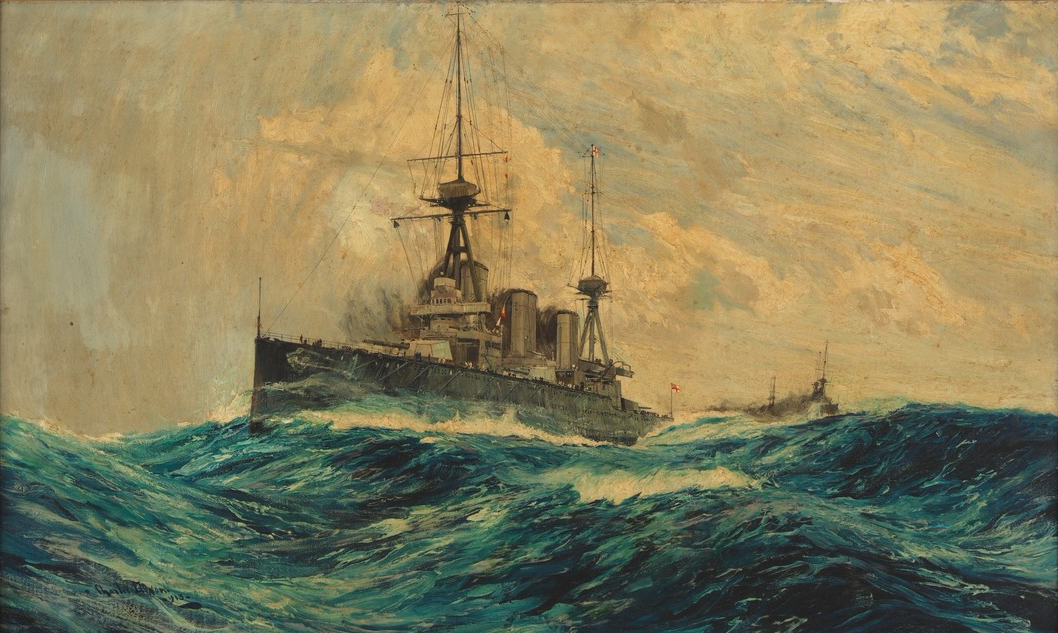
Australia in a 1913 painting by Charles Edward Dixon

Australia had an overall length of 590 feet (179.8 m), a beam of 80 feet (24.4 m), and a maximum draught of 30 feet 4 inches (9.2 m). The ship displaced 18,500 long tons (18,797 t) at load and 22,130 long tons (22,485 t) at deep load. She had a crew of 818 officers and ratings in 1913.

The ship was powered by two Parsons' sets of direct-drive steam turbines, each driving two propeller shafts, using steam provided by 31 coal-burning Babcock & Wilcox boilers. The turbines were rated at 44,000 shaft horsepower (33,000 kW) and were intended to give the ship a maximum speed of 25 knots (46 km/h; 29 mph). During trials in 1913, Australia's turbines provided 55,000 shp (41,013 kW), allowing her to reach 26.9 knots (49.8 km/h; 31.0 mph). Australia carried enough coal and fuel oil to give her a range of 6,690 nautical miles (12,390 km; 7,700 mi) at a cruising speed of 10 knots (19 km/h; 12 mph). (Note: Wherever possible the Royal Navy's preference was to use Welsh coal. Coal from Westport in New Zealand was considered to be the other that provided close to the same performance and so was widely used in the Pacific, Asia and the Indian Ocean. It was found that when using Westport coal Australia needed only 23 boilers in service to cruise at 16 knots. When using Australian coal it needed all of its 31 boilers in service to maintain 15 knots, leading to a shorter range and more frequent coaling stops. Another downside of using Australian coal was that it burned at such a high temperature that damaged the interior of the boilers.)

Australia carried eight BL 12-inch (305 mm) Mark X guns in four BVIII* twin turrets, the largest guns fitted to any Australian warship. Two turrets were mounted fore and aft on the centreline, identified as 'A' and 'X' respectively. The other two were wing turrets mounted amidships and staggered diagonally: 'P' was forward and to port of the centre funnel, while 'Q' was situated starboard and aft. Each wing turret had some limited ability to fire to the opposite side. Her secondary armament consisted of sixteen BL 4-inch (102 mm) Mark VII guns positioned in the superstructure. She mounted two submerged tubes for 18-inch torpedoes, one on each side aft of 'X' barbette, and 12 torpedoes were carried.

The Indefatigables were protected by a waterline 4–6-inch (102–152 mm) armoured belt that extended between and covered the end barbettes. Their armoured deck ranged in thickness between 1.5 and 2.5 inches (38 and 64 mm) with the thickest portions protecting the steering gear in the stern. The main battery turret faces were 7 inches (178 mm) thick, and the turrets were supported by barbettes of the same thickness.

Australia's 'A' turret was fitted with a 9-foot (2.7 m) rangefinder at the rear of the turret roof. It was also equipped to control the entire main armament, in case normal fire control positions were knocked out or rendered inoperable.

=== Modifications ===
Australia received a single QF 3-inch (76 mm) 20 cwt anti-aircraft (AA) gun on a high-angle Mark II mount that was added in March 1915. This had a maximum depression of 10° and a maximum elevation of 90°. It fired a 12.5-pound (5.7 kg) shell at a muzzle velocity of 2,500 ft/s (760 m/s) at a rate of fire of 12–14 rounds per minute. It had a maximum effective ceiling of 23,500 ft (7,200 m). It was provided with 500 rounds. The 4-inch guns were enclosed in casemates and given blast shields during a refit in November 1915 to better protect the gun crews from weather and enemy action, and two aft guns were removed at the same time. An additional 4-inch gun was fitted during 1917 as an AA gun. It was mounted on a Mark II high-angle mounting with a maximum elevation of 60°. It had a reduced propellant charge with a muzzle velocity of only 2,864 ft/s (873 m/s); 100 rounds were carried for it.

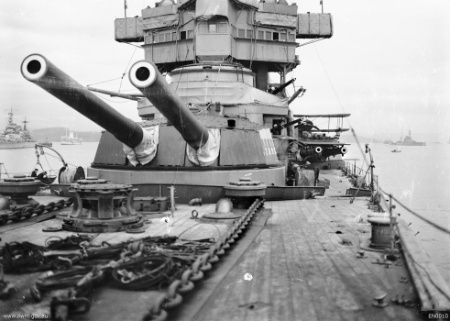
Australia's forward turret ('A') in 1918. Note the port (i.e. left-side) wing turret in the background with a biplane on its roof

Australia received a fire-control director sometime between mid-1915 and May 1916; this centralised fire control under the director officer, who now fired the guns. The turret crewmen merely had to follow pointers transmitted from the director to align their guns on the target. This greatly increased accuracy, as it was easier to spot the fall of shells and eliminated the problem of the ship's roll dispersing the shells when each turret fired independently. Australia was also fitted with an additional inch of armour around the midships turrets following the Battle of Jutland.

By 1918, Australia carried a Sopwith Pup and a Sopwith 1½ Strutter on platforms fitted to the top of 'P' and 'Q' turrets. The first flying off by a 1½ Strutter was from Australia's 'Q' turret on 4 April 1918. Each platform had a canvas hangar to protect the aircraft during inclement weather. At the end of World War I, Australia was described as "the least obsolescent of her class".

After the war, both anti-aircraft guns were replaced by a pair of QF 4-inch Mark V guns on manually operated high-angle mounts in January 1920. Their elevation limits were −5° to 80°. The guns fired a 31-pound (14 kg) shell at a muzzle velocity of 2,387 ft/s (728 m/s) at a rate of fire of 10–15 rounds per minute. They had a maximum effective ceiling of 28,750 ft (8,760 m).

== Acquisition and construction ==
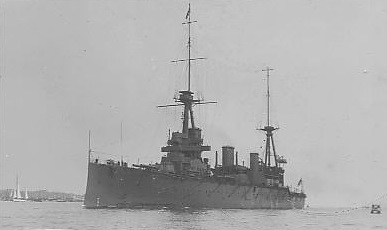
HMAS Australia on delivery in the UK, 1913

At the start of the 20th century, the British Admiralty maintained that naval defence of the British Empire, including the Dominions, should be unified under the Royal Navy. Attitudes on this matter softened during the first decade, and at the 1909 Imperial Conference, the Admiralty proposed the creation of 'Fleet Units': forces consisting of a battlecruiser, three light cruisers, six destroyers, and three submarines. Although some were to be operated by the Royal Navy at distant bases, particularly in the Far East, the Dominions were encouraged to purchase fleet units to serve as the core of new national navies: Australia and Canada were both encouraged to do so at earliest opportunity, New Zealand was asked to partially subsidise a fleet unit for the China Station, and there were plans for South Africa to fund one at a future point.

Each fleet unit was designed as a "navy in miniature", and would operate under the control of the purchasing Dominion during peacetime. In the event of widespread conflict, the fleet units would come under Admiralty control, and would be merged to form larger fleets for regional defence. Australia was the only Dominion to purchase a full fleet unit, and while the New Zealand-funded battlecruiser was donated to the Royal Navy outright, no other nation purchased ships under the fleet unit plan.

On 9 December 1909, a cable was sent by Governor-General Lord Dudley to the Secretary of State for the Colonies, The Earl of Crewe, requesting that construction of three Town class cruisers and an Indefatigable-class battlecruiser start at earliest opportunity. It is unclear why this design was selected, given that it was known to be inferior to the battlecruisers entering service with the German Imperial Navy (Kaiserliche Marine). Historian John Roberts has suggested that the request may have been attributable to the Royal Navy's practice of using small battleships and large cruisers as flagships of stations far from Britain, or it might have reflected the preferences of the First Sea Lord and Admiral of the Fleet John Fisher, preferences not widely shared.

The Australian Government decided on the name Australia, as this would avoid claims of favouritism or association with a particular state. The ship's badge depicted the Federation Star overlaid by a naval crown, and her motto was "Endeavour", reflecting both an idealisation of Australians' national spirit and attitude, and a connection to James Cook and HM Bark Endeavour. On 6 May 1910, George Reid, Australia's high commissioner to the United Kingdom, sent a telegram cable to the Australian Government suggesting that the ship be named after the newly crowned King George V, but this was rebuffed.

Bids for construction were forwarded to the Australian Government by Reid on 7 March 1910, and Prime Minister Alfred Deakin approved the submission by John Brown & Company to construct the hull and machinery, with separate contracts awarded to Armstrong and Vickers for the battlecruiser's armament. The total cost of construction was set at £2 million. Contracts were signed between the Admiralty and the builders to avoid the problems of distant supervision by the Australian Government, and a close watch on proceedings was maintained by Reid and Captain Francis Haworth-Booth, the Australian Naval Representative in London.

Australia's keel was laid at John Brown & Company's Clydebank yard on 23 June 1910, and was assigned the yard number 402. The ship was launched by Lady Reid on 25 October 1911, in a ceremony which received extensive media coverage. Australia's design was altered during construction to incorporate improvements in technology, including the newly developed nickel-steel armour plate. While it was intended that the entire ship be fitted with the new armour, manufacturing problems meant that older armour had to be used in some sections: the delay in sourcing the older armour plates set construction back half a year. Despite this, John Brown & Company delivered the ship £295,000 under budget.

During construction, First Lord of the Admiralty Winston Churchill attempted to arrange for Australia to remain in British waters on completion. Although the claim was made on strategic grounds, the reasoning behind it was so the Australian-funded ship could replace one to be purchased with British defence funds. This plan was successfully resisted by Admiral George King-Hall, then Commander-in-Chief of the Royal Navy's Australia Squadron.

Australia sailed for Devonport, Devon in mid-February 1913 to begin her acceptance trials. Testing of the guns, torpedoes, and machinery was successful, but it was discovered that two hull plates had been damaged during the launch, requiring the battlecruiser to dock for repairs. Australia was commissioned into the RAN at Portsmouth on 21 June 1913. Two days later, Rear Admiral George Patey, the first Rear Admiral Commanding Australian Fleet, raised his flag aboard Australia.

At launch, the standard ship's company was 820, over half of which were Royal Navy personnel; the other half was made up of Australian-born RAN personnel, or Britons transferring from the Royal Navy to the RAN. Accommodation areas were crowded, with each man having only 14 inches (36 cm) of space to sling his hammock when Australia was fully manned. Moreover, the ventilation system was designed for conditions in Europe, and was inadequate for the climate in and around Australia. On delivery, Australia was the largest warship in the Southern Hemisphere.

== Operational history ==
=== Voyage to Australia ===
Following her commissioning, Australia hosted several official events. On 30 June, King George V and Edward, Prince of Wales, visited Australia to farewell the ship. During this visit, King George knighted Patey on the ship's quarterdeck—the first time a naval officer was knighted aboard a warship since Francis Drake. On 1 July, Patey hosted a luncheon which was attended by imperial dignitaries, including Reid, the Agents-General of the Australian states, First Lord of the Admiralty Winston Churchill, Secretary of State for the Colonies Lewis Harcourt, and the High Commissioners of other British Dominions. That afternoon, 600 Australian expatriates were invited to a ceremonial farewelling, and were entertained by shows and fireworks. Journalists and cinematographers were allowed aboard to report on Australia prior to her departure, and an official reporter was embarked for the voyage to Australia: his role was to promote the ship as a symbol of the bond between Australia and the United Kingdom. (Note: Only 25 per cent of the crew were Australian born on the first voyage to Australia. More were to join when the ship arrived in Australia.)

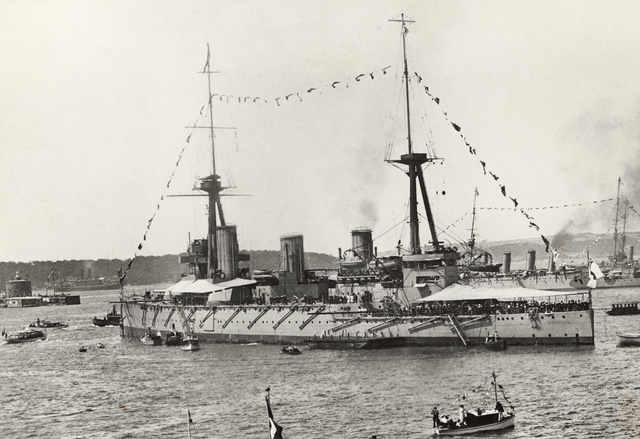
Australia, Sydney, and Melbourne shortly after the Australian fleet unit's first entry into Sydney Harbour. The near ship's torpedo net supports are visible along the hull.

Australia was escorted by the light cruiser HMAS Sydney during the voyage to Australia. On 25 July, the two ships left England for South Africa: the visit was part of an agreement between the Prime Ministers of Australia and South Africa to promote the link between the two nations, along with the nations' links to the rest of the British Empire. The two ships were anchored in Table Bay from 18 to 26 August, during which the ships' companies participated in parades and receptions, while tens of thousands of people came to observe the ships. The two ships also visited Simon's Town, while Australia additionally called into Durban. No other major ports were visited on the voyage, and the warships were instructed to avoid all major Australian ports.

Australia and Sydney reached Jervis Bay on 2 October, where they rendezvoused with the rest of the RAN fleet (the cruisers Encounter and Melbourne, and the destroyers Parramatta, Warrego, and Yarra). The seven warships prepared for a formal fleet entry into Sydney Harbour. On 4 October, Australia led the fleet into Sydney Harbour, where responsibility for Australian naval defence was passed from the Royal Navy's Australia Squadron, commanded by King-Hall aboard HMS Cambrian, to the RAN, commanded by Patey aboard Australia.

=== Early service ===
In her first year of service, Australia visited as many major Australian ports as possible, to expose the new navy to the widest possible audience and induce feelings of nationhood: naval historian David Stevens claims that these visits did more to break down state rivalries and promote the unity of Australia as a federated commonwealth than any other event. During late 1913, footage for the film Sea Dogs of Australia was filmed aboard the battlecruiser; the film was withdrawn almost immediately after first screening in August 1914 because of security concerns.

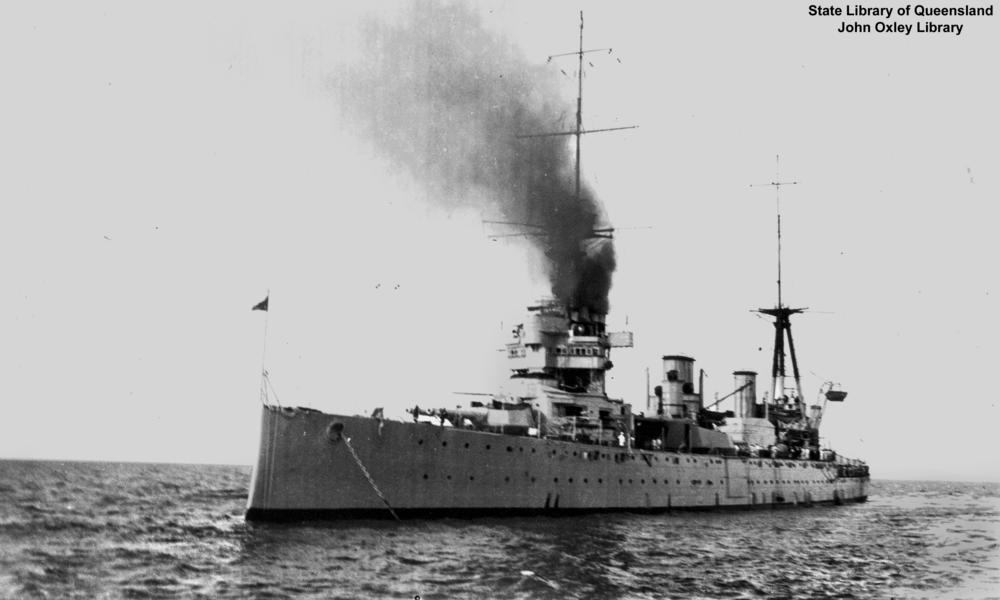
Australia at anchor in Queensland waters

During July 1914, Australia and other units of the RAN fleet were on a training cruise in Queensland waters. On 27 July, the Australian Commonwealth Naval Board learnt through press telegrams that the British Admiralty thought that there would be imminent and widespread war in Europe following the July Crisis, and had begun to position its fleets as a precaution. Three days later, the Board learnt that the official warning telegram had been sent: at 22:30, Australia was recalled to Sydney to take on coal and stores.

On 3 August, the RAN was placed under Admiralty control. Orders for RAN warships were prepared over the next few days: Australia was assigned to the concentration of British naval power on the China Station, but was allowed to seek out and destroy any armoured warships (particularly those of the German East Asia Squadron) in the Australian Station before doing so. Vice Admiral Maximilian von Spee, commander of the German squadron, was aware of Australia's presence in the region and her superiority to his entire force; the German admiral's plan was to harass British shipping and colonies in the Pacific until the presence of Australia and the China Squadron forced his fleet to relocate to other seas.

=== World War I ===
==== Securing local waters ====
The British Empire declared war on Germany on 5 August, and the RAN swung into action. Australia had departed Sydney the night before, and was heading north to rendezvous with other RAN vessels south of German New Guinea. The German colonial capital of Rabaul was considered a likely base of operations for von Spee, and Patey put together a plan to clear the harbour. Australia's role was to hang back: if the armoured cruisers SMS Scharnhorst and SMS Gneisenau were present, the other RAN vessels would lure them into range of the battlecruiser. The night-time operation was executed on 11 August, and no German ships were found in the harbour. Over the next two days, Australia and the other ships unsuccessfully searched the nearby bays and coastline for the German ships and any wireless stations, before returning to Port Moresby to refuel.

In late August, Australia and Melbourne escorted a New Zealand occupation force to German Samoa. Patey believed that the German fleet was likely to be in the eastern Pacific, and Samoa would be a logical move. Providing protection for the New Zealand troopships was a beneficial coincidence, although the timing could have been better, as an Australian expedition to occupy German New Guinea departed from Sydney a few days after the New Zealand force left home waters—Australia was expected to support both, but Patey only learned of the expeditions after they had commenced their journeys. The battlecruiser left Port Moresby on 17 August and was met by Melbourne en route on 20 August. The next day, they reached Nouméa and the New Zealand occupation force, consisting of the troopships Moeraki and Monowai, the French cruiser Montcalm, and three Pelorus-class cruisers. The grounding of Monowai delayed the expedition's departure until 23 August; the ships reached Suva, Fiji on 26 August, and arrived off Apia early in the morning of 30 August. The city surrendered without a fight, freeing Australia and Melbourne to depart at noon on 31 August to meet the Australian force bound for Rabaul.

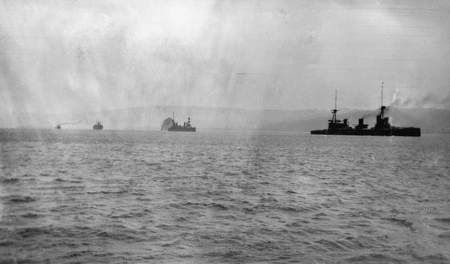
Australia leading the ships of the Australian Naval and Military Expeditionary Force into Rabaul Harbour on 12 September 1914

The Australian invasion force had mustered off the Louisiade Archipelago by 9 September; the assembled ships included Australia, the cruisers Sydney, and Encounter, the destroyers Parramatta, Warrego, and Yarra, the submarines AE1 and AE2, the auxiliary cruiser HMAS Berrima, the storeship SS Aorangi, three colliers and an oiler. The force sailed north, and at 06:00 on 11 September, Australia deployed two picket boats to secure Karavia Bay for the expeditionary force's transports and supply ships. Later that day, Australia captured the German steamer Sumatra off Cape Tawui. After this, the battlecruiser stood off, in case she was required to shell one of the two wireless stations the occupation force was attempting to capture. The German colony was captured, and on 15 September, Australia departed for Sydney.

==== Pursuit of von Spee ====
The presence of Australia around the former German colonies, combined with the likelihood of Japan declaring war on Germany, prompted von Spee to withdraw his ships from the region. On 13 August, the East Asia Squadron—except for SMS Emden, which was sent to prey on British shipping in the Indian Ocean—had begun to move eastwards. After appearing off Samoa on 14 September, then attacking Tahiti eight days later, von Spee led his force to South America, and from there planned to sail for the Atlantic. Patey was ordered on 17 September to head back north with Australia and Sydney to protect the Australian expeditionary force. On 1 October, Australia, Sydney, Montcalm, and Encounter headed north from Rabaul to find the German ships, but turned around to return at midnight, after receiving an Admiralty message about the Tahiti attack. Although Patey suspected that the Germans were heading for South America and wanted to follow with Australia, the Admiralty was unsure that the intelligence was accurate, and tasked the battlecruiser with patrolling around Fiji in case they returned. Australia reached Suva on 12 October, and spent the next four weeks patrolling the waters around Fiji, Samoa, and New Caledonia: despite Patey's desires to range out further, Admiralty orders kept him chained to Suva until early November.

As Patey predicted, von Spee had continued east, and it was not until his force inflicted the first defeat on the Royal Navy in 100 years at the Battle of Coronel that Australia was allowed to pursue. Departing on 8 November, the battlecruiser replenished coal from a pre-positioned collier on 14 November, and reached Chamela Bay (near Manzanillo, Mexico) 12 days later. Patey was made commander of a multinational squadron tasked with preventing the German squadron from sailing north to Canadian waters, or following them if they attempted to enter the Atlantic via the Panama Canal or around Cape Horn. Patey's ships included Australia, the British light cruiser HMS Newcastle and the Japanese cruisers Izumo, Asama, and the ex-Russian battleship Hizen. The ships made for the Galapagos Islands, which were searched from 4 to 6 December. After finding no trace of von Spee's force, the Admiralty ordered Patey to investigate the South American coast from Perlas Island down to the Gulf of Guayaquil. The German squadron had sailed for the Atlantic via Cape Horn, and was defeated by a British fleet after attempting to raid the Falkland Islands on 8 December. Patey's squadron learned of this 10 December, while off the Gulf of Panama; Australia's personnel were disappointed that they did not have the chance to take on Scharnhorst and Gneisenau. Nevertheless, the battlecruiser's presence in the Pacific during 1914 had provided an important counter to the German armoured cruisers, and enabled the RAN to participate in the Admiralty's global strategy. Moreover, it is unlikely that the attack on Rabaul would have gone ahead had Australia not been available to protect the landing force.

==== North Sea operations ====
As the threat of a German naval attack had been removed by the destruction of the East Asia Squadron, Australia was free for deployment elsewhere. Initially, the battlecruiser was to serve as flagship of the West Indies Squadron, with the task of pursuing and destroying any German vessels that evaded North Sea blockades. Australia was ordered to sail to Jamaica via the Panama Canal, but as it was closed to heavy shipping, she was forced to sail down the coast of South America and pass through the Strait of Magellan during 31 December 1914 and 1 January 1915—Australia is the only ship of the RAN to cross from the Pacific to the Atlantic by sailing under South America. During the crossing, one of the warship's propellers was damaged, and she had to limp to the Falkland Islands at half speed. Temporary repairs were made, and Australia departed on 5 January. A vessel well clear of the usual shipping routes was spotted on the afternoon of the next day, and the battlecruiser attempted to pursue, but was hampered by the damaged propeller. Unable to close the gap before sunset, a warning shot was fired from 'A' turret, which caused the ship—the former German passenger liner, now naval auxiliary Eleonora Woermann—to stop and be captured. As Australia could not spare enough personnel to secure and operate the merchant ship, and Eleonora Woermann was too slow to keep pace with the battlecruiser, the German crew were taken aboard and the ship was sunk.

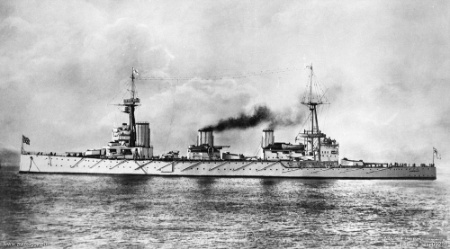
Australia in the Firth of Forth during February 1915

Following the Battle of Dogger Bank, the Admiralty saw the need for dedicated battlecruiser squadrons in British waters, and earmarked Australia to lead one of them. On 11 January, while en route to Jamaica, Australia was diverted to Gibraltar. Reaching there on 20 January, the battlecruiser was ordered to proceed to Plymouth, where she arrived on 28 January and paid off for a short refit. The docking was completed on 12 February, and Australia reached Rosyth on 17 February after sailing through a gale. She was made flagship of the 2nd Battlecruiser Squadron (2nd BCS) of the Battlecruiser Fleet, part of the British Grand Fleet, on 22 February. Vice Admiral Patey was appointed to command this squadron. In early March, to avoid a conflict of seniority between Patey and the leader of the Battlecruiser Fleet, Vice Admiral David Beatty, Patey was reassigned to the West Indies, and Rear Admiral William Pakenham raised his flag aboard Australia. British and Allied ships deployed to the North Sea were tasked with protecting the British Isles from German naval attack, and keeping the German High Seas Fleet penned in European waters through a distant blockade while trying to lure them into a decisive battle. During her time with the 2nd BCS, Australia's operations primarily consisted of training exercises (either in isolation or with other ships), patrols of the North Sea area in response to actual or perceived German movements, and some escort work. These duties were so monotonous, one sailor was driven insane.

Soon after its arrival in the United Kingdom there were 259 cases of respiratory illness as the crew were not used to the colder weather. A subsequent measles epidemic in June 1915 forced the Admiralty to conclude that the ship's doctors lacked expertise in ship hygiene, which forced them to appoint a senior fleet surgeon to assist in improving conditions on the ship.

Australia joined the Grand Fleet in a sortie on 29 March, in response to intelligence that the German fleet was leaving port as the precursor to a major operation. By the next night, the German ships had withdrawn, and Australia returned to Rosyth. On 11 April, the British fleet was again deployed on the intelligence that a German force was planning an operation. The Germans intended to lay mines at the Swarte Bank, but after a scouting Zeppelin located a British light cruiser squadron, they began to prepare for what they thought was a British attack. Heavy fog and the need to refuel caused Australia and the British vessels to return to port on 17 August, and although they were redeployed that night, they were unable to stop two German light cruisers from laying the minefield. From 26 to 28 January 1916, the 2nd BCS was positioned off the Skagerrak while the 1st Light Cruiser Squadron swept the strait in an unsuccessful search of a possible minelayer.

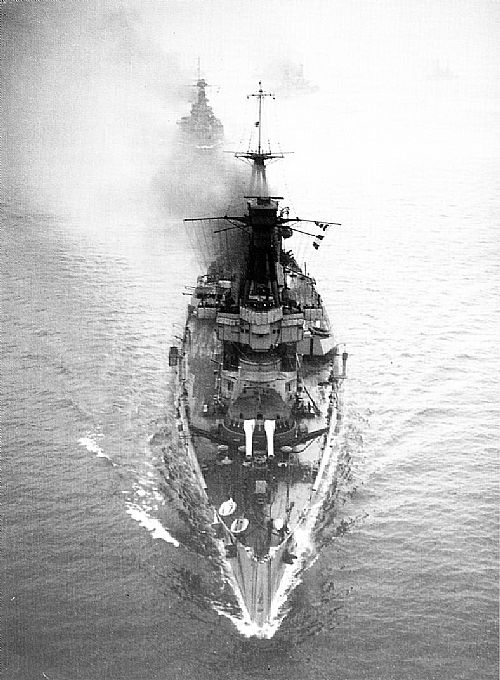
Australia leading a line of ships under the Forth Bridge

==== Collision with HMS New Zealand ====
On the morning of 21 April 1916, the 2nd BCS left Rosyth at 04:00 (accompanied by the 4th Light Cruiser Squadron and destroyers) again bound for the Skagerrak, this time to support efforts to disrupt the transport of Swedish ore to Germany.

The planned destroyer sweep of the Kattegat was cancelled when word came that the High Seas Fleet was mobilizing for an operation of their own (later learned to be timed to coincide with the Irish Easter Rising), and the British ships were ordered to a rendezvous point in the middle of the North Sea, with the 1st and 3rd Battlecruiser Squadrons while the rest of the Grand Fleet made for the south-eastern end of the Long Forties.

At 15:30 on the afternoon of 22 April, the three squadrons of battlecruisers were patrolling together to the north-west of Horn Reefs when heavy fog came down, while the ships were steaming abreast at 19.5 knots, with Australia on the port flank. Concerned about possible submarine attack Beatty issued instructions at 15:35 for the fleet to commence zigzagging. It took some time for the instruction to be relayed by signal flag down the line and so it wasn't until 15:40 that Australia with a cruiser to her port side commenced her first zigzag and swung to starboard. The crew were aware that New Zealand was on that side about five cables (926 metres) away but the poor visibility meant that as they made their turn they didn't see her until it was too late and they hit at 15:43, despite Australia attempting to turn away to port. Australia's side was torn open from frames 59 to 78 by the armour plate on the hull below her sister ships P-turret, while as New Zealand turned away her outer port propeller damaged Australia's hull below her Q-turret.

Australia slowed to half-speed as the mist hid her sister ship, but the damage to New Zealand's propeller caused a temporary loss of control and she swung back in front of Australia which despite turning to port, had her stem crushed at 15:46 as she scraped the side of New Zealand, just behind her P-turret. Procedural errors were found to be the cause of the collisions. Both ships came to a complete stop about 30–40 yd (27–37 m) apart while their respective officers assessed the damage. The damage control teams on the Australia were soon busy shoring up bulkheads and sealing off the damaged portions to prevent any more water entering the ship. Meanwhile, off watch Australian sailors took advantage of a convenient potato locker to hurl both its contents and insults at the crew of their nearby sister ship. New Zealand was soon underway, returning to Rosyth with the rest of the squadron.

The same fog caused the battleship Neptune to collide with a merchant ship and the destroyers Ambuscade, Ardent and Garland to collide with one another. Once it was safe to proceed Australia with her speed restricted to 12, and then later to 16 knots lagging behind the rest of the squadron, arrived back at Rosyth at 16:00 hours on 23 April to find both drydocks occupied, one by New Zealand and the other by HMS Dreadnought so she departed at 21:00 hours on that same day for Newcastle-on-Tyne, where as she approached its floating dock on the River Tyne, on 24 April the tugs were unable to keep her straight during strong winds and she hit the edge of the floating dock severely bending her port rudder and breaking both of her port propellers. As New Zealand had commandeered Australia's spare propeller (which was in store at Rosyth) to replace her own damaged propeller, Indefatigable's spare port inner propeller was installed on Australia's port outer shaft and Invincible's port inner spare propeller was installed on the port inner shaft. As this facility couldn't handle these additional repairs Australia was ordered following replacement of the propellers and temporary repairs to her hull to proceed to Devonport, Devon.

Australia was not able to depart Newcastle-on-Tyne until 13:30 on 1 May, and unknowingly streamed through a minefield to anchor in the Humber near the Nore Lightship. They departed on 3 May, and while anchoring overnight in Deal the crew witnessed an air raid on Deal Pier prior to the battlecruiser docking in Devonport at 13:00 on 6 May. While docked the ship was visited by Australian Prime Minister Billy Hughes, accompanied by the Australian High Commissioner to Britain Andrew Fisher and Senator Allan McDougall. Following completion of repairs the battlecruiser departed Devonport at 11:00 on 31 May, sailing west about round Ireland to arrive at Scapa Flow at 06:30 on 3 June and returned to Rosyth on 9 June, thus missing the Battle of Jutland.

==== Post-Jutland operations ====
On the evening of 18 August, the Grand Fleet put to sea in response to a message deciphered by Room 40, which indicated that the High Seas Fleet, minus II Squadron, would be leaving harbour that night. The German objective was to bombard Sunderland on 19 August, with extensive reconnaissance provided by airships and submarines. The Grand Fleet sailed with 29 dreadnought battleships and 6 battlecruisers. (Note: While no sources explicitly state that Australia was part of the fleet at this time, of the seven Royal Navy battlecruisers then in commission, Indomitable was under refit through August and the only one unavailable for action.) Throughout the next day, Jellicoe and Scheer received conflicting intelligence, with the result that having reached its rendezvous in the North Sea, the Grand Fleet steered north in the erroneous belief that it had entered a minefield before turning south again. Scheer steered south-eastward to pursue a lone British battle squadron sighted by an airship, which was in fact the Harwich Force under Commodore Tyrwhitt. Having realised their mistake, the Germans changed course for home. The only contact came in the evening when Tyrwhitt sighted the High Seas Fleet but was unable to achieve an advantageous attack position before dark, and broke off. Both the British and German fleets returned home, with two British cruisers sunk by submarines and a German dreadnought battleship damaged by a torpedo.

The year 1917 saw a continuation of the battlecruiser's routine of exercises and patrols into the North Sea, with few incidents. During this year Australia's activities were limited to training voyages between Rosyth and Scapa Flow and occasional patrols to the north-east of Britain in search of German raiders. In May, while preparing the warship for action stations, a 12-inch shell became jammed in the shell hoist when its fuze became hooked onto a projection. After the magazines were evacuated, Lieutenant-Commander F. C. Darley climbed down the hoist and successfully removed the fuze. On 26 June, King George V visited the ship. On 12 December, Australia was involved in a second collision, this time with the battlecruiser HMS Repulse. Following this accident, she underwent three weeks of repairs from December 1917 until January 1918. During the repair period, Australia became the first RAN ship to launch an aircraft, when a Sopwith Pup took off from her quarterdeck on 18 December. On 30 December, Australia shelled a suspected submarine contact, the only time during her deployment with the 2nd BCS that she fired on the enemy.

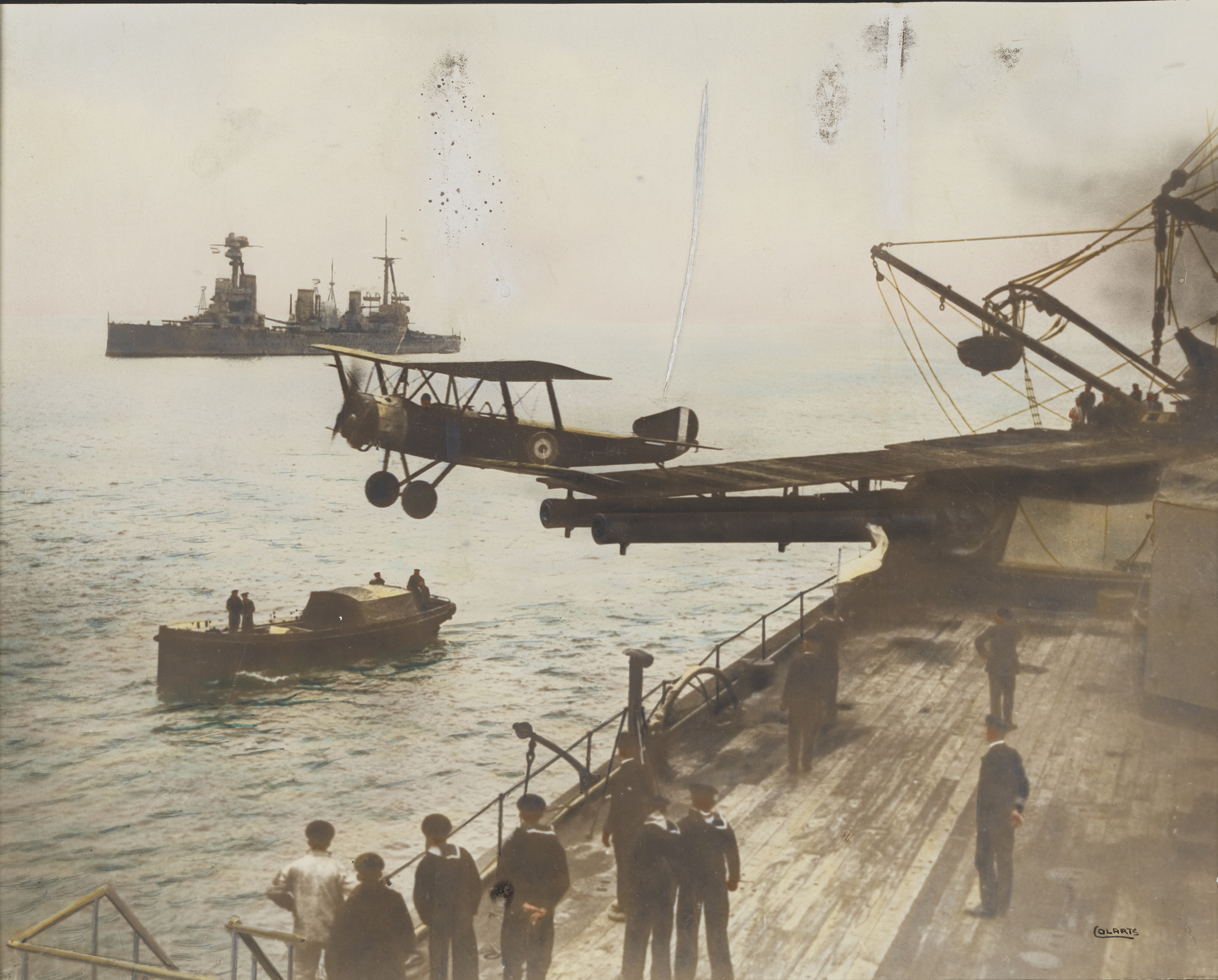
A Sopwith 1½ Strutter launching from one of Australia's turrets

In February 1918, the call went out for volunteers to participate in a special mission to close the port of Zeebrugge using blockships. Although many aboard Australia volunteered their services in an attempt to escape the drudgery of North Sea patrols, only 11 personnel—10 sailors and an artificer engineer were selected for the raid, which occurred on 23 April. The artificer engineer was posted to the engine room of the requisitioned ferry HMS Iris II. The other Australians were assigned to the boiler rooms of the blockship Thetis, or as part of a storming party along the mole. All of the volunteers survived—Australia was the only ship to have no casualties from the raid with one awarded the Distinguished Service Cross (DSC), three the Distinguished Service Medal (DSM), while another three were mentioned in dispatches. (Note: The 11 Australians who took part in the Zeebrugge and the medals they were awarded were Artificer Engineer William Edgar [DSC), Leading Stokers William Bourke, Reginald Hopkins, Godfrey Lockard, Norbert McCrory, James Strong; Leading Seaman Dalmorton Rudd DSM, George Bush DSM and Able Seamans Henry Gillard, Leopold Thomas Newland and George Edward Staples DSM. Gillard, Newland and McCrory were mentioned in dispatches. A twelfth man, Stoker John Walter Carter, was selected for the raid but was unable to participate due to illness. Edgar was assigned command of the engine room in HMS Iris II, while the five seamen were assigned to HMS Vindictive, and the five stokers to HMS Thetis. Bush, Gillard, Newland, Rudd and Staples unsuccessfully participated in a ballot by their peers for the award of a Victoria Cross (VC) to a Royal Navy rating.) The five sailors were listed in the ballot to receive a Victoria Cross, but did not receive the award.

During 1918, Australia and the Grand Fleet's other capital ships on occasion escorted convoys travelling between Britain and Norway. The 2nd BCS spent the period from 8 to 21 February covering these convoys in company with battleships and destroyers, and put to sea on 6 March in company with the 1st Battlecruiser Squadron to support minelayers. From 8 March on, the battlecruiser tested the capabilities of aircraft launched from platforms mounted over 'P' and 'Q' turrets. Australia, along with the rest of the Grand Fleet, sortied on the afternoon of 23 March 1918 after radio transmissions had revealed that the High Seas Fleet was at sea after a failed attempt to intercept the regular British convoy to Norway. However, the Germans were too far ahead of the British and escaped without firing a shot. The 2nd BCS sailed again on 25 April to support minelayers, then cover one of the Scandinavian convoys the next day. Following the successful launch of a fully laden Sopwith 1½ Strutter scout plane on 14 May, Australia started carrying two aircraft—a Strutter for reconnaissance, and a Sopwith Camel fighter—and operated them until the end of the war. The 2nd BCS again supported minelayers in the North Sea between 25 and 26 June and 29–30 July. During September and October, Australia and the 2nd BCS supervised and protected minelaying operations north of Orkney.

==== War's end ====
When the armistice with Germany was signed on 11 November 1918 to end World War I, one of the conditions was that the German High Seas Fleet was to be interred at Scapa Flow. The German fleet crossed the North Sea, and on 21 November, the British Grand Fleet sailed out to meet it; Australia led the port division of the fleet. Australia then escorted the battlecruiser SMS Hindenburg to Scapa Flow, and was assigned as the German vessel's guardship. Australia subsequently formed part of the force which guarded the High Seas Fleet during late 1918 and early 1919, and spent much of her time either at anchor at Scapa Flow, or conducting patrols in the North Sea. This monotonous duty contributed to low morale among some sections of the ship's crew.

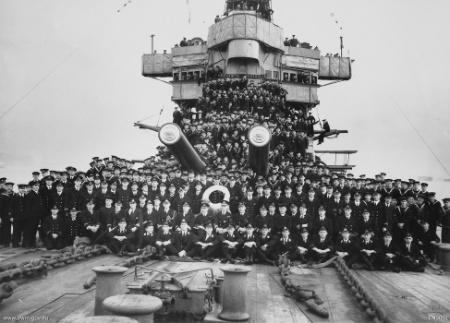
Group portrait of Australia's ship's company in December 1918

After being formally farewelled by the Prince of Wales and First Sea Lord Rosslyn Wemyss on 22 April 1919, Australia departed from Portsmouth for home the next day. She sailed in company with HMAS Brisbane for the first part of the voyage, but the light cruiser later had to detach to tow the submarine J5. Australia arrived in Fremantle on 28 May 1919, the first time the ship had seen home waters in four and a half years. Despite returning home, the battlecruiser remained under Admiralty control until 1 August 1919.

Australia was not awarded any official battle honours, although personnel aboard the battlecruiser and her successor claimed the operations in the Pacific, the North Sea patrol duties, and the battlecruiser's presence at the surrender of the German High Seas Fleet as unofficial honours. Following a reorganisation of RAN battle honours in 2010, the honours "Rabaul 1914" and "North Sea 1915–18" were retroactively awarded on 1 March 2010.

=== Mutiny ===
Australia's ship's company had consistently suffered from low morale since the battlecruiser entered service, and the proportion of Australia's sailors who were placed on disciplinary charges during World War I was among the highest in the RAN. Many of the Australian sailors were chafing under the severity of naval discipline and what they saw as excessive punishment for minor breaches; one example was of a sailor who was charged with desertion, imprisoned for three months, and lost all pay for staying out too late on Armistice Day. Factors which contributed to low morale and poor discipline included frustration at not participating in the Battle of Jutland, high rates of illness, limited opportunities for leave, delays or complete lack of deferred pay, and poor-quality food. The continuation of strict wartime routines and discipline after the armistice frustrated the ship's crew. There was also the perception that Australia's British personnel were being promoted faster than their Australian counterparts and were dominating leadership positions. The battlecruiser's arrival in Fremantle on 28 May was met with extensive hospitality, which was reciprocated where possible by the sailors with invitations and tours of their vessel. There were opportunities for shore leave, but these were limited as Australia was only in port for three days, and had to sail early on 1 June for Melbourne.

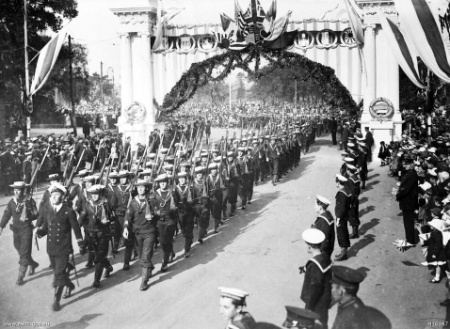
Personnel from Australia march down a decorated street in 1919, following the battlecruiser's return to Sydney

Representatives of the ship's company approached Captain Claude Cumberlege to ask for a one-day delay on departure; this would allow the sailors to have a full weekend of leave, give Perth-born personnel the chance to visit their families, and give personnel another chance to invite people aboard. Cumberlege replied that as Australia had a tight schedule of "welcome home" port visits, such delays could not even be considered. The next morning, at around 10:30, between 80 and 100 sailors gathered in front of 'P' turret, some in working uniform, others who had just returned from shore leave still in libertyman rig. Cumberlege sent the executive officer to find out why the men had assembled, and on learning that they were repeating the previous day's request for a delay in departure, went down to address them. In a strict, legalistic tone, he informed the sailors that delaying Australia's departure was impossible, and ordered them to disperse. The group obeyed this order, although some were vocal in their displeasure. Shortly after, Australia was ready to depart, but when the order to release the mooring lines and get underway was given, Cumberlege was informed that the stokers had abandoned the boiler rooms. After the assembly on deck, some sailors had masked themselves with black handkerchiefs, and encouraged or intimidated the stokers on duty into leaving their posts, leaving the navy's flagship stranded at the buoy, in full view of dignitaries and crowds lining the nearby wharf. The senior non-commissioned officers, along with sailors drafted from other departments, were sent to the boiler room to get Australia moving, and departure from Fremantle was only delayed by an hour.

Australian naval historians David Stevens and Tom Frame disagree on what happened next. Stevens states that Cumberledge assembled the ship's company in the early afternoon, read the Articles of War, lectured them on the seriousness of refusing duty, then ordered the stokers to go to their stations, which they did meekly. Frame claims the stokers returned to duty freely once the battlecruiser was underway, before Cumberledge cleared the lower deck and spoke to the sailors. After addressing the sailors, Cumberledge gathered the ship's senior officers for an inquiry. Five men, including one of the Victoria Cross nominees from the Zeebrugge raid, were charged (Note: The five charged mutineers were Dalmorton Rudd DSM, his younger 18 year old brother Leonard "Lenny" Thomas Rudd, Willian McIntosh, Ken Paterson and Wilfred "Pitta" Thompson.) with inciting a mutiny and arrested pending a court-martial, which was held aboard HMAS Encounter on 20 June, after Australia arrived in Sydney. The ruling was that the five men had "joined a mutiny, not accompanied by violence", and they were sentenced to imprisonment in Goulburn Gaol: two for a year, one for eighteen months, and two for two years with hard labour. A number of other sailors were charged with participating in a mutiny, but again, Stevens and Frame disagree on details: the former claims 7 men were successfully charged, while the latter says 32 sailors were subsequently acquitted of mutiny, but then successfully charged with refusing duty. Both authors agree that these men were tried by the captain while Australia was still at sea, and punished with 90 days each in cells.

Following the court-martial of the five ringleaders, there was debate among the public, in the media, and within government over the sentences; while most agreed that a mutiny had occurred, there were differences in opinion on the leniency or severity of the punishments imposed. Public sympathy was with the sailors, and several politicians pressured the government and the Admiralty to pardon the men. The Admiralty thought the sentences were fair, but on 10 September announced that they would be halved on consideration of the sailors' youth. Despite this, controversy continued until 21 November: after the Australian government appealed directly to the Admiralty, it was agreed that the sailors would be released on 20 December. However, the government had angered the Naval Board in appealing to the Admiralty without consulting the Board first.

The First Naval Member, Rear Admiral Percy Grant and Commander of the Fleet, Commodore John Dumaresq, submitted their resignations in protest, as they felt the show of clemency would lead to a breakdown in discipline, and that if the government continued to communicate with the Admiralty without consulting the Board, it would undermine the Board's authority. The two officers were later convinced to withdraw their resignations after receiving assurances that Board would be consulted before all future government communications to Britain regarding the RAN, and that notices would be posted in all ships explaining that the sentences were correct, but the onset of peace had led to clemency in this particular case.

=== Post-war ===
In May 1920, Australia participated in celebrations and naval activities associated with the visit of the Prince of Wales. From July to November 1920, an Avro 504 floatplane of the Australian Air Corps was embarked aboard Australia as part of a series of trials intended to cumulate in the creation of a naval aviation branch. The aircraft was stored on the quarterdeck next to 'Q' turret, and was deployed and recovered by derrick. Inter-service rivalry and the ship's reduction to non-seagoing status in September prevented further operations.

Following the demise of German naval power in the Pacific the fleet unit concept was no longer seen as being relevant, and Australia did not have a clear role. As a result, post-war budget cuts prompted the RAN to take the battlecruiser out of active service, as the large share of resources and manpower consumed by Australia could be better used elsewhere in the RAN. In August 1920 the battlecruiser was rated by the Naval Board as 11th out of the RAN's 12 priorities. The ship's company was reduced later that year and she was assigned to Flinders Naval Depot as a gunnery and torpedo training ship. In the event of a major conflict, Australia was to serve in a role akin to coastal artillery. She was not considered to have been placed in reserve at this time, as it was not possible for the RAN to provide a trained complement at short notice.

== Decommissioning and fate ==
Australia returned to Sydney in November 1921, and was paid off into reserve in December. By this time battlecruisers built before the Battle of Jutland were considered obsolete, and there is no record of the Admiralty suggesting that Australia purchase a replacement. Moreover, it is unlikely that the Australian Government would have agreed to such a suggestion given the prevailing political and financial conditions. As the Admiralty had decided to phase out 12-inch guns and had stopped the manufacture of shells for these weapons shortly after the war, it would have been necessary to replace Australia's main armament once the Navy's stock of shells reached their expiry date given that it was not possible to produce replacement shells in Australia. This was also not financially feasible for the government, particularly given the RAN's lack of interest in retaining the ship.

The 1922 Washington Naval Treaty was a mutual naval arms limitation and disarmament treaty between the five major naval powers of the time: the United Kingdom, the United States of America, Japan, Italy, and France. One of the main aspects of the treaty was the limitation on the number and size of capital ships each nation possessed; as the RAN was counted as part of the Royal Navy for the purposes of the treaty, Australia was one of the battlecruisers nominated for disposal to meet the British limit. The battlecruiser had to be made unusable for warlike activities within six months of the treaty's ratification, then disposed of by scuttling, as Australia did not have the facilities to break her up for scrap, and the British share of target ships was taken up by Royal Navy vessels. This was the only time the Australian military has been affected by a disarmament treaty until the 1997 Ottawa Treaty banning the use of anti-personnel mines.

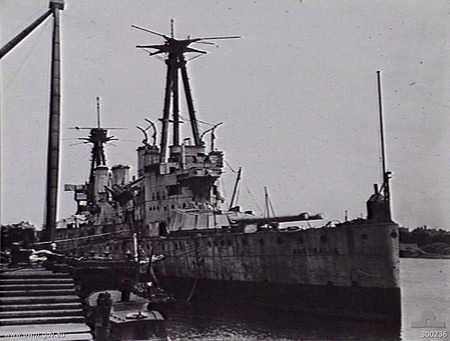
Australia alongside at Garden Island, 1924

When Australia was decommissioned in 1921, some of her equipment was removed for use in other ships, but after the November 1923 Cabinet decision confirming the scuttling, RAN personnel and private contractors began to remove piping and other small fittings. Between November 1923 and January 1924, £68,000 of equipment was reclaimed; over half was donated to tertiary education centres (some of which was still in use in the 1970s), while the rest was either marked for use in future warships, or sold as souvenirs. Some consideration was given to reusing Australia's 12-inch guns in coastal fortifications, but this did not occur as ammunition for these weapons was no longer being manufactured by the British, and the cost of building suitable structures was excessive. It was instead decided to sink the gun turrets and spare barrels with the rest of the ship.

There was a proposal to remove Australia's conning tower and install it on the Sydney Harbour foreshore; although this did not go ahead, the idea was later used when the foremast of HMAS Sydney was erected as a monument at Bradleys Head. The ship's outer port propeller is on display at the Australian War Memorial, while other artefacts are in the collections of the War Memorial, the Australian National Maritime Museum, and the Royal Australian Navy Heritage Centre.

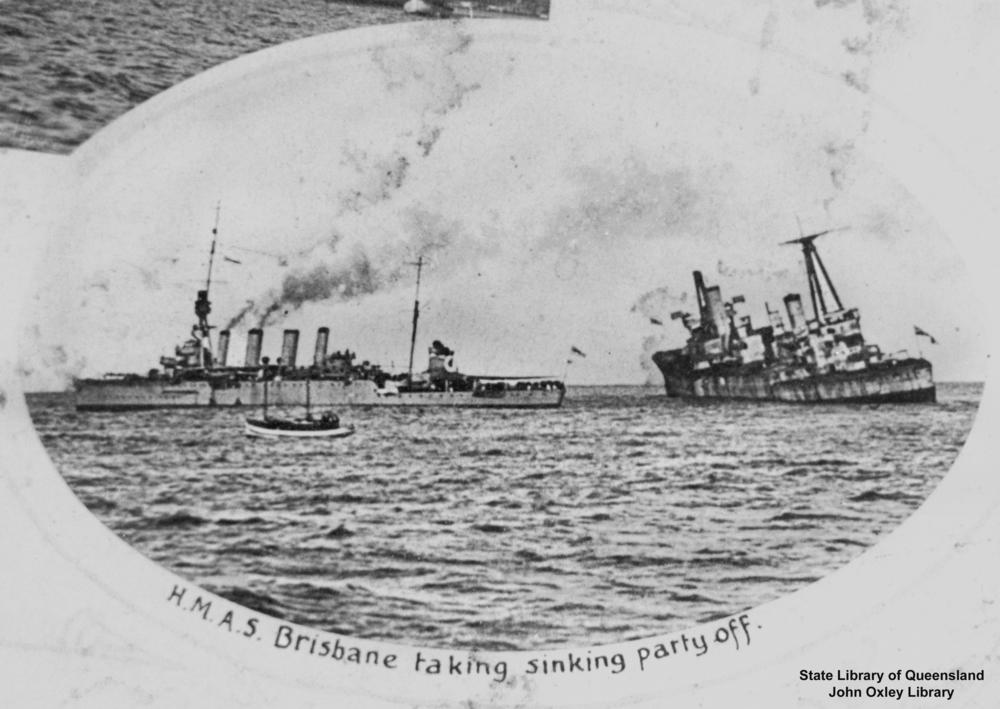
HMAS Brisbane recovers the scuttling party from Australia shortly before the latter's sinking

The scuttling was originally scheduled for Anzac Day (25 April) 1924, but was brought forward to 12 April, so the visiting British Special Service Squadron could participate. On the day of the sinking, Australia was towed out to a point 25 nautical miles (46 km; 29 mi) northeast of Sydney Heads. Under the terms of the Washington Treaty, the battlecruiser needed to be sunk in water that was deep enough to make it infeasible to refloat her at a future date. The former flagship was escorted by the Australian warships Melbourne, Brisbane, Adelaide, Anzac, and Stalwart, the ships of the Special Service Squadron, and several civilian ferries carrying passengers. Many personnel volunteered to be part of the scuttling party, but only those who had served aboard her were selected.

At 14:30, the scuttling party set the charges, opened all seacocks, and cleared the ship. Explosive charges blew a hole in the hull a few minutes later, but it took 20 minutes for the intake of water to bring holes cut in the battlecruiser's upper flanks to the waterline. The angle of list increased significantly, causing the three spare 12-inch barrels lashed to the deck to break free and roll overboard, before Australia inverted completely and began to sink stern-first. Australia submerged completely at 14:51; a Royal Australian Air Force aircraft dropped a wreath where the warship had sunk, while Brisbane fired a rolling 21-gun salute. The wreck was gazetted as being at 33°53′25″S 151°46′5″E, 270 metres (890 ft) below. However, there were discrepancies with other sources, and the exact location of Australia was unknown.

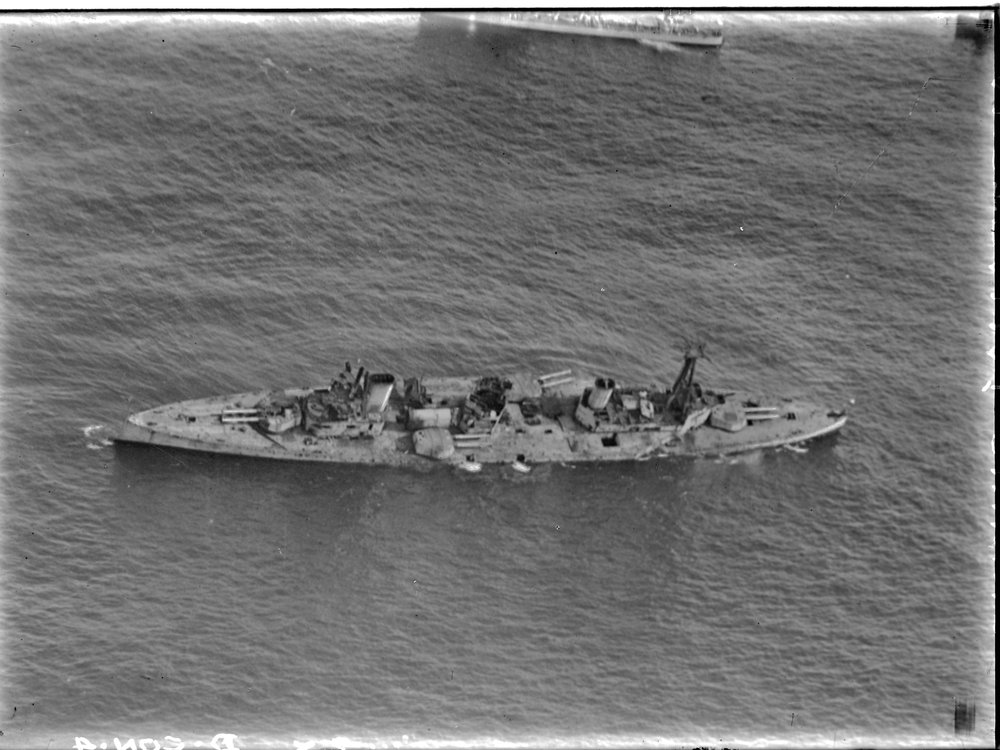
Australia listing to port and sinking

There are two schools of thought surrounding the decision to scuttle the battlecruiser. The first is that sinking Australia was a major blow to the nation's ability to defend herself. Following the battlecruiser's scuttling, the most powerful warships in the RAN were four old light cruisers. The battlecruiser had served as a deterrent to German naval action against Australia during the war, and with growing tensions between Japan and the United States of America, that deterrence might have been required if the nations had become openly hostile towards each other or towards Australia.

The opposing argument is that, while an emotive and symbolic loss, the ship was obsolete, and would have been a drain on resources. Operating and maintaining the warship was beyond the capabilities of the RAN's post-war budgets, necessitating the ship's reduction in status in 1920 and assignment to reserve in 1921. Ammunition and replacement barrels for the main guns were no longer manufactured. To remain effective, Australia required major modernisation (including new propulsion machinery, increased armour and armament, and new fire control systems) at a cost equivalent to a new County-class cruiser.

In 1990, a large, unknown shipwreck was encountered by the Fugro Seafloor Surveys vessel MV Moana Wave 1 while surveying the path of the PacRimWest communications cable. One of the survey ship's crew theorised that the wreck, located at 33°51′54.21″S 151°44′25.11″E in 390 metres (1,280 ft) of water, was Australia, but Fugro kept the information to themselves until 2002, when the company's Australian branch mentioned the discovery during a conference. This piqued the interest of a member of the New South Wales Heritage Office, who requested copies of the company's data. The size and location of the ship pointed towards it being Australia, but the depth meant verification through inspection could only be achieved with a remote operated vehicle (ROV). The RAN was approached in 2007 for assistance, but although they supported the project, the RAN did not have the equipment to assist.

In March 2007, the United States Navy loaned the deep-sea ROV CURV-21 to the Australian Government, to locate and recover a Black Hawk helicopter which crashed during the Australian response to the 2006 Fijian coup d'état. While en route back to Australia, the ROV, carried aboard Defence Maritime Services vessel Seahorse Standard, was directed to Fugro's coordinates at the request of the NSW Heritage Office to verify and inspect the wreck. Video footage captured by the ROV allowed the NSW Heritage Office to confirm that the wreck was Australia by matching features like the superstructure and masts to historical photographs. Although initially sinking stern-first, the battlecruiser levelled out as she sank, with the aft mast the first to strike the bottom. After hitting the seabed, Australia slid about 400 metres (1,300 ft) to her final resting place. The wreck site is protected under the federal Historic Shipwrecks Act 1976.

== Artifacts ==
The outer port side propeller of Australia can be found on the grounds of the Australian War Memorial, between the main building and Anzac Hall. This is believed to be the spare from HMS Indefatigable that was fitted to Australia after her collision with HMS New Zealand in 1916.

Prior to her scuttling the ship's bell was transferred to the Australian War Memorial. By 1927 the bell was being rung at the Memorial to mark the commencement and conclusion of the traditional two minutes of silence on Remembrance Day. It is still on display at the Australian War Memorial, but is no longer rung.

A 12-inch armour piercing shell from Australia is held by the Australian War Memorial.
