= Type 917 torpedo retriever/target ship =

Chinese auxiliary ship

History

PRC
- Ordered: Late 1980s
- Awarded: Early 1990s
- Builder: 4 different shipyards
- Laid down: Since early 1990s
- Launched: Since early 1990s
- Commissioned: Early 1990s to 2007
- Maiden voyage: Early 1990s
- In service: Since early 1990s
- Status: Active

Class overview
- Operators: People's Liberation Army Navy
- Preceded by: Type 803 torpedo retriever
- Succeeded by: Dachou class torpedo retriever/target ship
- Built: Early 1990s to 2007

General characteristics
- Class & type: Damen
- Type: Range support vessel / target ship (AGT) / Torpedo retriever (TR/TWR)
- Displacement: 720 t (710 long tons; 790 short tons)
- Length: 63.68 m (208 ft 11 in)
- Beam: 9 m (29 ft 6 in)
- Draft: 2.8 m (9 ft 2 in)
- Propulsion: 2 diesel engines each @ 1,100 bhp (820 kW)
- Speed: 13 kn (24 km/h; 15 mph)
- Sensors & processing systems: Navigation radar
- Electronic warfare & decoys: None
- Armament: Small caliber guns
- Armour: None
- Aircraft carried: None
- Aviation facilities: None

Type 917 torpedo retriever (TR/TWR) / range support vessel / target ship (AGT ) is a type of little known auxiliary ship built in the People's Republic of China (PRC) for the People's Liberation Army Navy (PLAN). As a successor to earlier Type 803 torpedo retriever, Type 917 TR/TWR/AGT has received NATO reporting name Damen class, or 大门 in Chinese, meaning "big gate". As with its predecessors, once these have retired from their original torpedo-retrieving duties, they are converted into range support vessels/target ships, until finally sunk as targets. Specification:

- Length: (m): 63.68
- Beam (m): 9
- Draft (m): 2.8
- Standard displacement (t): 720
- Full displacement (t): 742.5
- Speed (kt): 13
- Propulsion: 8300CZ marine diesels @ 1100 hp x 2

Type 917 AGT/TWR/TR in PLAN service is designated by a combination of two Chinese characters followed by a three-digit number. The second Chinese character is Yun (运), meaning "transport" in Chinese, indicating that in addition to range support and targeting missions, this class is also used as transports (AP), though some modification work is required to remove onboard range support and targeting equipment before it can be used to transport cargoes. The first Chinese character denotes which fleet the ship is in service with, with East (Dong, 东) for East Sea Fleet, North (Bei, 北) for North Sea Fleet, and South (Nan, 南) for South Sea Fleet. However, the pennant numbers are subject to change due to changes of Chinese naval ships naming convention, or when units are transferred to different fleets. As of 2022, a total of nine ships have been identified:

Type	NATO designation	Pennant No.	Name (English)	Name (Han 中文)	Commissioned	Displacement	Fleet	Status
Type 917 torpedo retriever (TR/TWR) / range support / target ship (AGT)	Damen class	Bei-Yun 455	North Transport 455	北运 455	1990s-2007	720 t	North Sea Fleet	Active
Type 917 torpedo retriever (TR/TWR) / range support / target ship (AGT)	Damen class	Bei-Yun 484	North Transport 484	北运 484	1990s-2007	720 t	North Sea Fleet	Active
Type 917 torpedo retriever (TR/TWR) / range support / target ship (AGT)	Damen class	Bei-Yun 485	North Transport 485	北运 485	1990s-2007	720 t	North Sea Fleet	Active
Type 917 torpedo retriever (TR/TWR) / range support / target ship (AGT)	Damen class	Bei-Yun 529	North Transport 529	北运 529	1990s-2007	720 t	North Sea Fleet	Active
Type 917 torpedo retriever (TR/TWR) / range support / target ship (AGT)	Damen class	Dong-Yun 758	East Transport 758	东运 758	1990s-2007	720 t	East Sea Fleet	Active
Type 917 torpedo retriever (TR/TWR) / range support / target ship (AGT)	Damen class	Dong-Yun 803	East Transport 803	东运 803	1990s-2007	720 t	East Sea Fleet	Active
Type 917 torpedo retriever (TR/TWR) / range support / target ship (AGT)	Damen class	Nan-Yun 841	South Transport 841	南运 841	1990s-2007	720 t	South Sea Fleet	Active
Type 917 torpedo retriever (TR/TWR) / range support / target ship (AGT)	Damen class	Nan-Yun 844	South Transport 844	南运 844	1990s-2007	720 t	South Sea Fleet	Active
Type 917 torpedo retriever (TR/TWR) / range support / target ship (AGT)	Damen class	Nan-Yun 854	South Transport 854	南运 854	1990s-2007	720 t	South Sea Fleet	Active
