= HMAS Ardent =

1968 Attack-class patrol boat of the Royal Australian Navy

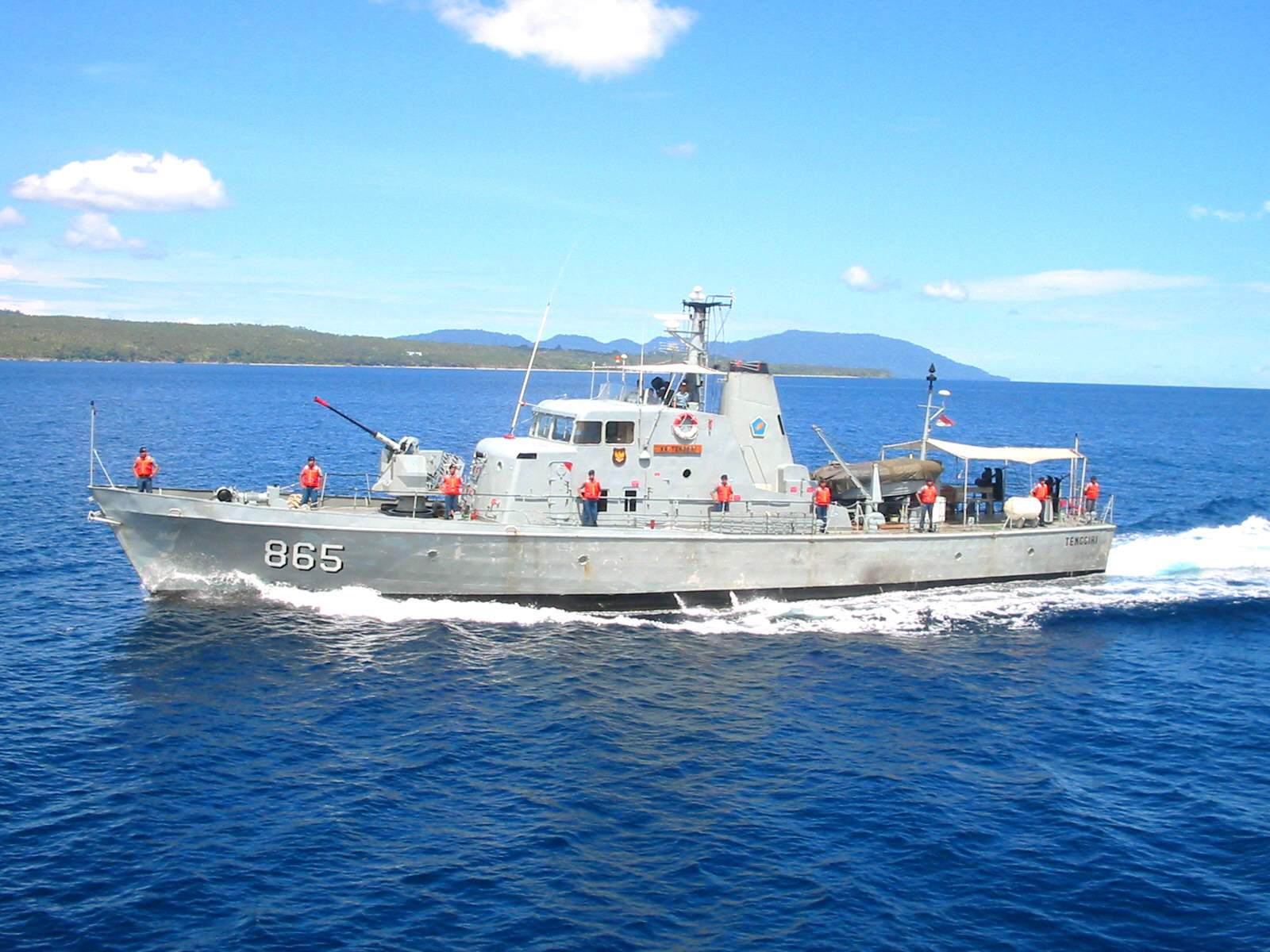
- Ex-HMAS Ardent as KRI Tenggiri in service with the Indonesian Navy in 2005

History

Australia
- Name: Ardent
- Builder: Evans Deakin and Company
- Laid down: October 1967
- Launched: 27 April 1968
- Commissioned: 26 October 1968
- Decommissioned: 6 January 1994
- In service: 1994
- Out of service: December 1998
- Reclassified: Training ship (1994)
- Motto: "Flame And Fury"
- Fate: Sold to civilian service, then to Indonesian Navy
- Badge

Indonesia
- Name: Tenggiri
- Acquired: 2002
- Commissioned: 2 January 2003
- Status: Active as of 2018

General characteristics (in Australian service)
- Class & type: Attack-class patrol boat
- Displacement: 100 tons standard; 146 tons full load
- Length: 107.6 ft (32.8 m) length overall
- Beam: 20 ft (6.1 m)
- Draught: 6.4 ft (2.0 m) at standard load; 7.3 ft (2.2 m) at full load
- Propulsion: 2 × 16-cylinder Paxman YJCM diesel engines; 3,460 shp (2,580 kW); 2 shafts
- Speed: 24 knots (44 km/h; 28 mph)
- Range: 1,200 nautical miles (2,200 km; 1,400 mi) at 13 knots (24 km/h; 15 mph)
- Complement: 3 officers, 16 sailors
- Armament: 1 × Bofors 40 mm L/70 (SAK-40/L70-315) gun; 2 × .50-calibre M2 Browning machine guns; Small arms

HMAS Ardent (P 87/A243) was an Attack-class patrol boat of the Royal Australian Navy (RAN). She was built by Evans Deakin and Company, and was commissioned into the RAN in 1968. Ardent was decommissioned in 1994, then assigned as a navigation training vessel. At the end of 1998, she was removed from service. Initially marked for preservation at the Darwin Military Museum, the vessel was sold into civilian service in 2001 after the Northern Territory government declined. In 2002, the patrol boat was acquired by the Indonesian Navy, and commissioned as KRI Tenggiri (865) in 2003.

== Design and construction ==
The Attack class was ordered in 1964 to operate in Australian waters as patrol boats (based on lessons learned through using the Ton-class minesweepers on patrols of Borneo during the Indonesia-Malaysia Confrontation), and to replace a variety of old patrol, search-and-rescue, and general-purpose craft. Initially, nine were ordered for the RAN, with another five for Papua New Guinea's Australian-run coastal security force, although another six ships were ordered to bring the class to twenty vessels. The patrol boats had a displacement of 100 tons at standard load and 146 tons at full load, were 107.6 feet (32.8 m) in length overall, had a beam of 20 feet (6.1 m), and draughts of 6.4 feet (2.0 m) at standard load, and 7.3 feet (2.2 m) at full load. Propulsion machinery consisted of two 16-cylinder Paxman YJCM diesel engines, which supplied 3,460 shaft horsepower (2,580 kW) to the two propellers. The vessels could achieve a top speed of 24 knots (44 km/h; 28 mph), and had a range of 1,200 nautical miles (2,200 km; 1,400 mi) at 13 knots (24 km/h; 15 mph). The ship's company consisted of three officers and sixteen sailors. Main armament was a bow-mounted Bofors 40 mm gun, supplemented by two .50-calibre M2 Browning machine guns and various small arms. The ships were designed with as many commercial components as possible: the Attacks were to operate in remote regions of Australia and New Guinea, and a town's hardware store would be more accessible than home base in a mechanical emergency.

Ardent was laid down by Evans Deakin and Company at Brisbane, Queensland in October 1967, launched on 27 April 1968, and commissioned on 26 October 1968.

== Australian service ==
Ardent suffered a major fire in August 1969, raising questions about the design of the Attack class. The fire damage was repaired at Cockatoo Island Dockyard. She underwent refits at Cockatoo Island in 1970, 1974 and 1976.

In November 1977, Ardent intercepted a boat carrying 180 Vietnamese asylum seekers.

On 23 July 1980, Ardent apprehended two Indonesian fishing boats poaching in Australian waters off Derby.

Ardent was transferred to the Hobart Port Division of the Royal Australian Navy Reserve on 18 June 1982.

=== Decommissioning ===
The patrol boat was decommissioned on 6 January 1994 and redesignated as a General Purpose Vessel with the pennant number A243. It was assigned as a navigation training ship for junior warfare officers based in Sydney. Ardent was replaced by the Defence Maritime Services vessel Seahorse Mercator.

=== Disposal ===
Ardent was withdrawn from service in December 1998 and offered to the government of the Northern Territory, which considered placing it in the Darwin Military Museum, but remained moored at HMAS Coonawarra until the NT government declined the offer in August 2000. She was then sold to Britton Marine (Australia) Pty Ltd as MV Ardent in January 2001 for $150,000.

== Indonesian service ==
MV Ardent was sold to the Indonesian Navy in 2002 and commissioned as KRI Tenggiri (865) on 2 January 2003. In December 2013 it was patrolling the Strait of Malacca, and in February 2018 detained three vessels illegally mining tin off the Bangka Belitung Islands.
