= Dachou-class torpedo retriever/target ship =

Chinese naval auxiliary ship class

History

PRC
- Ordered: Late 2000s
- Awarded: Early 2010s
- Laid down: Early 2010s
- Launched: Early 2010s
- Completed: Since early 2010s
- Commissioned: Since early 2010s
- Status: Active

Class overview
- Operators: People's Liberation Army Navy
- Preceded by: Type 917 torpedo retriever (TR/TWR) / target ship (AGT)
- Built: Early 2010s

General characteristics
- Class & type: Dachou
- Type: Torpedo retriever (TR/TWR) / range support vessel / target ship (AGT)
- Length: 68 m (223 ft 1 in)
- Propulsion: Marine Diesel
- Sensors & processing systems: Navigation radar

The Dachou class range support vessel/target ship (AGT)/torpedo retriever (TR/TRW) is a class of little known auxiliary ship built in the People's Republic of China (PRC) for the People's Liberation Army Navy (PLAN). Designed as a successor of earlier Type 917 torpedo retriever (TR/TWR)/target ship (AGT), the exact domestic Chinese type designation remains unknown, and this class is identified by its NATO reporting name Dachou class, or 大筹 in Chinese, meaning "big plan". Specification:

- Length: 68 meters (223 ft 1 in)

The Dachou class in PLAN service is designated by a combination of two Chinese characters followed by a three-digit number. The second Chinese character is Yun (运), meaning Transport in Chinese, indicating that in addition to range support and targeting missions, this class is also used as transport (AP), though some modification work is required to remove onboard range support and targeting equipment before it can be used to transport cargoes. The first Chinese character denotes which fleet the ship is service with, with East (Dong, 东) for East Sea Fleet, North (Bei, 北) for North Sea Fleet, and South (Nan, 南) for South Sea Fleet. However, the pennant numbers are subject to change due to changes of Chinese naval ships naming convention, or when units are transferred to different fleets. As of 2022, a total of four ships have been identified:

Type	NATO designation	Pennant No.	Name (English)	Name (Han 中文)	Commissioned	Displacement	Fleet	Status
Dachou-class target ship (AGT)	Dachou class	Bei-Yun 530	North Transport 530	北运 530	?	? t	North Sea Fleet	Active
Dachou-class target ship (AGT)	Dachou class	Dong-Yun 760	East Transport 760	东运 760	?	? t	East Sea Fleet	Active
Dachou-class target ship (AGT)	Dachou class	Nan-Yun 846	South Transport 846	南运 846	?	? t	South Sea Fleet	Active
Dachou-class target ship (AGT)	Dachou class	Nan-Yun 847	South Transport 847	南运 847	?	? t	South Sea Fleet	Active
