= Seahorse Spirit =

Ship built in 1980

History
- Name: Balder Hudson (1980–1986); British Viking (1986–1998)
- Operator: K/S Ocean Supply AS
- Builder: Marystown Shipyard, Marystown
- Yard number: 26
- Launched: 21 December 1979

History

Australia
- Name: Seahorse Spirit
- Operator: DMS Maritime
- In service: 1981
- Identification: Call sign:VNFG; IMO number: 7623904; MMSI number: 503040000
- Fate: Scrapped 22 July 2016

General characteristics
- Displacement: 2090 tons
- Length: 72 m (236 ft)
- Beam: 16 m (52 ft)
- Draught: 4.2 m (14 ft)
- Speed: 10 knots (19 km/h; 12 mph)
- Armament: None

Seahorse Spirit was a multi-purpose vessel operated by Defence Maritime Services under contract to the Royal Australian Navy (RAN). She was based at Westernport, Victoria.
