= Seahorse Mercator =

Ship built in 1998

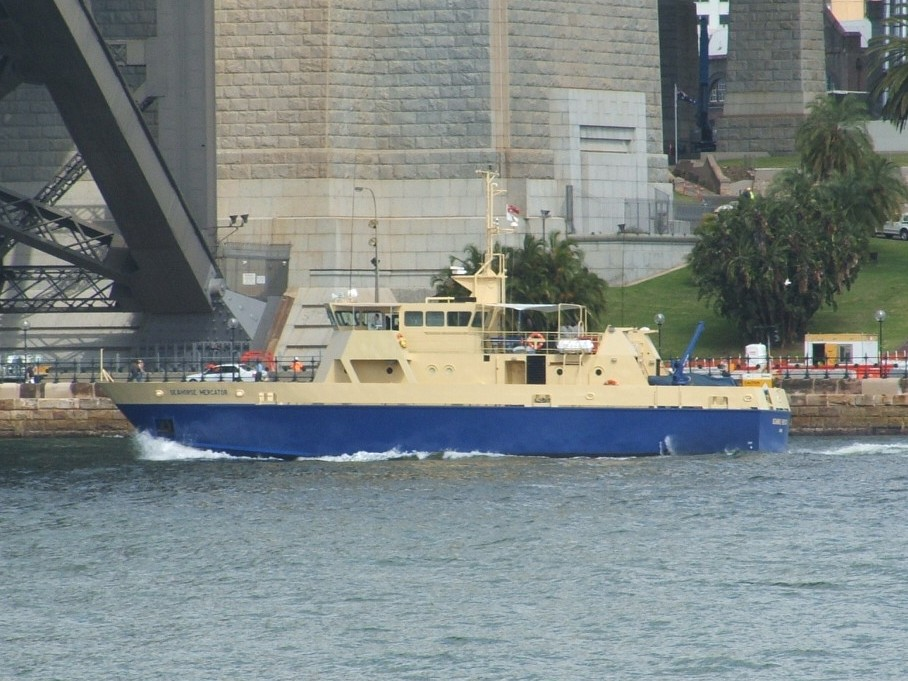
- Seahorse Mercator in 2007

History

Australia
- Name: Seahorse Mercator
- Namesake: Gerardus Mercator
- Operator: Teekay Shipping (Australia)
- Ordered: Early 1998
- Builder: Tenix
- Launched: 15 October 1998
- Acquired: 26 November 1998
- Identification: IMO number: 9188594; Callsign: VHN8774
- Status: Active, based at HMAS Waterhen

General characteristics
- Class & type: Pacific-class patrol boat variant
- Tonnage: 212 GT
- Displacement: 165 tons
- Length: 31.5 m (103 ft 4 in)
- Beam: 8.21 m (26 ft 11 in)
- Draught: 2.6 m (8 ft 6 in)
- Propulsion: 2 x Caterpillar 3304 diesel engines, 2 propellers
- Speed: 16 knots (30 km/h; 18 mph)
- Range: 2,880 nmi (5,330 km; 3,310 mi) at 8 knots (15 km/h; 9.2 mph)
- Complement: 5 crew + 3 instructors and 18 trainees
- Sensors & processing systems: 1 x Furuno FE 606 navigation radar, 1 x Decca Bridgemaster ARPA navigation radar

Seahorse Mercator is a navigational training vessel operated by Teekay Shipping Australia under contract to the Royal Australian Navy's (RAN) National Support Squadron. She is a modified version of the Pacific-class patrol boat design and is based at HMAS Waterhen in Sydney. The vessel was previously operated by DMS Maritime until a new contract for the management and operations of the National Support Squadron was awarded to Teekay Shipping in 2021.

== Design and construction ==
Seahorse Mercator is a variant of the Pacific-class patrol boat design. The ship has a displacement of 165 tons, a length of 31.5 metres (103 ft), a beam of 8.21 metres (26.9 ft), and a draught of 2.6 metres (8 ft 6 in). Propulsion is supplied by two Caterpillar 3304 diesels, driving two propellers. Maximum speed is 16 knots (30 km/h; 18 mph), with a range of 2,880 nautical miles (5,330 km; 3,310 mi) at 8 knots (15 km/h; 9.2 mph). Seahorse Mercator is run by a crew of five plus three instructors, and can carry up to eighteen trainees. Radars include a Furuno FE 606 navigation radar, and a Decca Bridgemaster ARPA navigation radar. The vessel is unarmed.

Seahorse Mercator was built by Tenix Ship Building Western Australia for DMS at a cost of A$4 million. The vessel was launched on 15 October 1998. The Canadian Forces Maritime Command's Orca-class patrol vessels were built to a modified variant of Seahorse Mercator's design.

== Operational history ==
Seahorse Mercator conducted sea trials during November 1998, with handover to DMS and the RAN on 26 November 1998. She was assigned to the naval base HMAS Waterhen, and replaced the Attack-class patrol boat HMAS Ardent as the RAN's Sydney-based navigational training vessel in December that year. Since then she has mainly operated in the Sydney area and has trained RAN personnel and sailors from other navies in coastal navigation, ship handling and watch keeping procedures.

In 2021 the commercial contract for operation of the vessel passed from DMS Maritime to Teekay Shipping.

Seahorse Mercator has a secondary role as a mine countermeasures craft.

Towards the end of 2025, Teekay Shipping Australia was awarded a contract under the Australia Defence Maritime Support Services Program (DMSSP) to provide crewing and support for ADV Cape Otway as one of the Royal Australian Navy's new navigational training vessel intended to replace the current Seahorse Mercator.
