= Type 803 torpedo retriever =

Chinese torpedo retriever ship

Class overview
- Builders: 425th Factory of PLAN
- Operators: People's Liberation Army Navy
- Succeeded by: Type 917 torpedo retriever/target ship
- In service: 1963 onward
- In commission: 1963 onward
- Planned: 6
- Completed: 6

General characteristics
- Type: Torpedo retriever
- Displacement: 93.17 long tons (94.67 t)
- Length: 29.85 m (97 ft 11 in)
- Beam: 5.98 m (19 ft 7 in)
- Draught: 1.56 m (5 ft 1 in)
- Depth: 2.98 m (9 ft 9 in)
- Propulsion: 2 × M50-3 marine diesel engines, with 2 shafts
- Speed: 18 knots (33 km/h; 21 mph)
- Range: 228 nmi (422 km; 262 mi)
- Sensors & processing systems: Navigation radar
- Electronic warfare & decoys: None
- Armament: 25 mm (0.98 in) or 37 mm (1.5 in) guns
- Armour: None
- Aircraft carried: None
- Aviation facilities: None

Type 803 torpedo retriever is a type of naval auxiliary ship currently in service with the People's Liberation Army Navy (PLAN). Construction began in October 1960 at the 425th Factory of PLAN, the predecessor of current Wuhu Shipyard, and the first ship was launched on March 15, 1963. Sea trials began on May 11, 1963, and the first unit was finally handed over to PLAN on December 24, 1963 at Lüshun. However, delivery of subsequent units was delayed due to political turmoil in China at the time, namely, the Cultural Revolution, so it was not until 1977, when the originally planned total of six units had finally been completed, including two foreign sales, one to Tanzania, and another to Cambodia. Specification:

- Displacement 93.17 long tons (94.67 t)
- Length: 29.85 m (97 ft 11 in)
- Beam: 5.98 m (19 ft 7 in)
- Draft: 1.56 m (5 ft 1 in)
- Depth: 2.98 m (9 ft 9 in)
- Propulsion: 2 × M50-3 marine diesel engines, with 2 shafts
- Speed: 18 knots (33 km/h; 21 mph)
- Range: 228 nmi (422 km; 262 mi)
- Armament: 25 mm (0.98 in) or 37 mm (1.5 in) guns
