= Fish-class torpedo recovery vessel =

Class of three torpedo recovery vessels

Class overview
- Builders: Williamstown Dockyard, Williamstown, Victoria
- Operators: Royal Australian Navy/Defence Maritime Services
- Built: January 1970 – April 1971
- Active: None
- Retired: 3

General characteristics
- Type: Torpedo Recovery Vessel
- Displacement: 94 long tons (96 t) full load
- Length: 26.8 metres (88 ft)
- Beam: 6.1 metres (20 ft)
- Draught: 1.1 metres (3 ft 7 in)
- Propulsion: 3 x V8 GM diesels, 890 horsepower (660 kW), 3 shafts
- Speed: 9.5 knots (17.6 km/h; 10.9 mph)
- Endurance: 63 hours at 8 knots (15 km/h; 9.2 mph)
- Crew: 9
- Sensors & processing systems: I-band navigational radar

The Fish class was a ship class of three torpedo recovery vessels previously operated by Defence Maritime Services (DMS).

== Design and construction ==
The class was ordered in 1969 as replacements for World War II-era torpedo recovery vessels.

The vessels each had a full load displacement of 94 long tons (96 t), a length of 26.8 metres (88 ft), a beam of 6.1 metres (20 ft), and a draught of 1.1 metres (3 ft 7 in). Propulsion machinery consisted of three GM V8 diesels, which supplied 890 horsepower (660 kW) to the three propeller shafts. Top speed was 9.5 knots (17.6 km/h; 10.9 mph), and the vessels had an endurance of 63 hours at 8 knots (15 km/h; 9.2 mph). Each Fish-class vessel could recover up to eight torpedoes via a watertight stern gate. They were unarmed, and their sensor suite was limited to an I-band navigational radar. Nine personnel made up the crew.

All three vessels were built at Williamstown Dockyard for the Royal Australian Navy between January 1970 and April 1971.

== Operational history ==
Originally identified only by the numbers 253–255, the vessels were named in 1983 and renumbered 801–803.

On entering service, TRV 253 was assigned to the target range at Jervis Bay, while the other two vessels were attached to HMAS Waterhen in Sydney. In addition to torpedo recovery, the boats were used as dive tenders and as training vessels for the Royal Australian Naval Reserve.

In 1988, the three vessels were sold to DMS. As part of the company's role in providing maritime support for the RAN, the vessels were assigned to various bases: Tuna to nearby HMAS Creswell, Trevally remaining at Waterhen, while Tailor sailed to HMAS Stirling in Western Australia.

As of 2012, only Tailor remained in service.

As of 2018, Tailor was decommissioned and put up for sale to the public effectively ending the service of this class

== Ships ==
- TRV Tuna (801), originally TRV 253.
- TRV Trevally (802), originally TRV 254.
- TRV Tailor (803) , originally TRV 255.
