= TRV Tailor =

Australian navy vessel

History

*Australia
- Name: TRV Tailor
- Namesake: The tailor
- Builder: Williamstown Dockyard, Victoria
- Completed: April 1971
- In service: 1971–1988 (RAN); 1988–2018 (DMS)
- Status: Decommissioned in 2018

General characteristics
- Class & type: Fish-class torpedo recovery vessel
- Displacement: 94 long tons (96 t) full load
- Length: 26.8 metres (88 ft)
- Beam: 6.1 metres (20 ft)
- Draught: 1.1 metres (3 ft 7 in)
- Propulsion: 3 x V8 GM diesels, 890 horsepower (660 kW), 3 shafts
- Speed: 9.5 knots (17.6 km/h; 10.9 mph)
- Endurance: 63 hours at 8 knots (15 km/h; 9.2 mph)
- Crew: 9
- Sensors & processing systems: I-band navigational radar

TRV Tailor (803) was one of three Torpedo Recovery Vessels operated by the Royal Australian Navy (RAN) and Defence Maritime Services (DMS). Ordered in 1969, the vessel, originally identified as TRV 255, was completed in 1971 and assigned to the naval base HMAS Waterhen in Sydney. The ship received a name and the pennant number "TRV 803" in 1983. In 1988, the three vessels were sold to DMS. Tailor was assigned to the naval base HMAS Creswell in Jervis Bay NSW. Tailor was decommissioned in 2018.

== Design and construction ==
The class was ordered in 1969 as replacements for World War II-era torpedo recovery vessels.

The vessels each have a full load displacement of 94 long tons (96 t), a length of 26.8 metres (88 ft), a beam of 6.1 metres (20 ft), and a draught of 1.1 metres (3 ft 7 in). Propulsion machinery consists of three GM V8 diesels, which supply 890 horsepower (660 kW) to the three propeller shafts. Top speed is 9.5 knots (17.6 km/h; 10.9 mph), and the vessels have an endurance of 63 hours at 8 knots (15 km/h; 9.2 mph). Each Fish-class vessel can recover up to eight torpedoes via a watertight stern gate. They are unarmed, and their sensor suite is limited to an I-band navigational radar. Nine personnel make up the crew.

Three vessels were built at Williamstown Dockyard for the Royal Australian Navy, with TRV 255 completed in April 1971.

== Operational history ==
On entering service, TRV 255 was assigned to the naval base HMAS Waterhen in Sydney. In addition to torpedo recovery, the vessels were used as dive tenders and as training vessels for the Royal Australian Naval Reserve.

In 1983, the boats were named and redesignated, with TRV 255 become Tailor, with the pennant number "TRV 803".

In 1988, the three vessels were sold to DMS. As part of the company's role in providing maritime support for the RAN, Tailor was assigned as a tender to HMAS Creswell in Western Australia. Tailor was still active with DMS as of 2012.

In 2018, TRV Tailor was decommissioned and put up for sale to the public.
