= Seahorse Standard =

Australian multi-purpose vessel

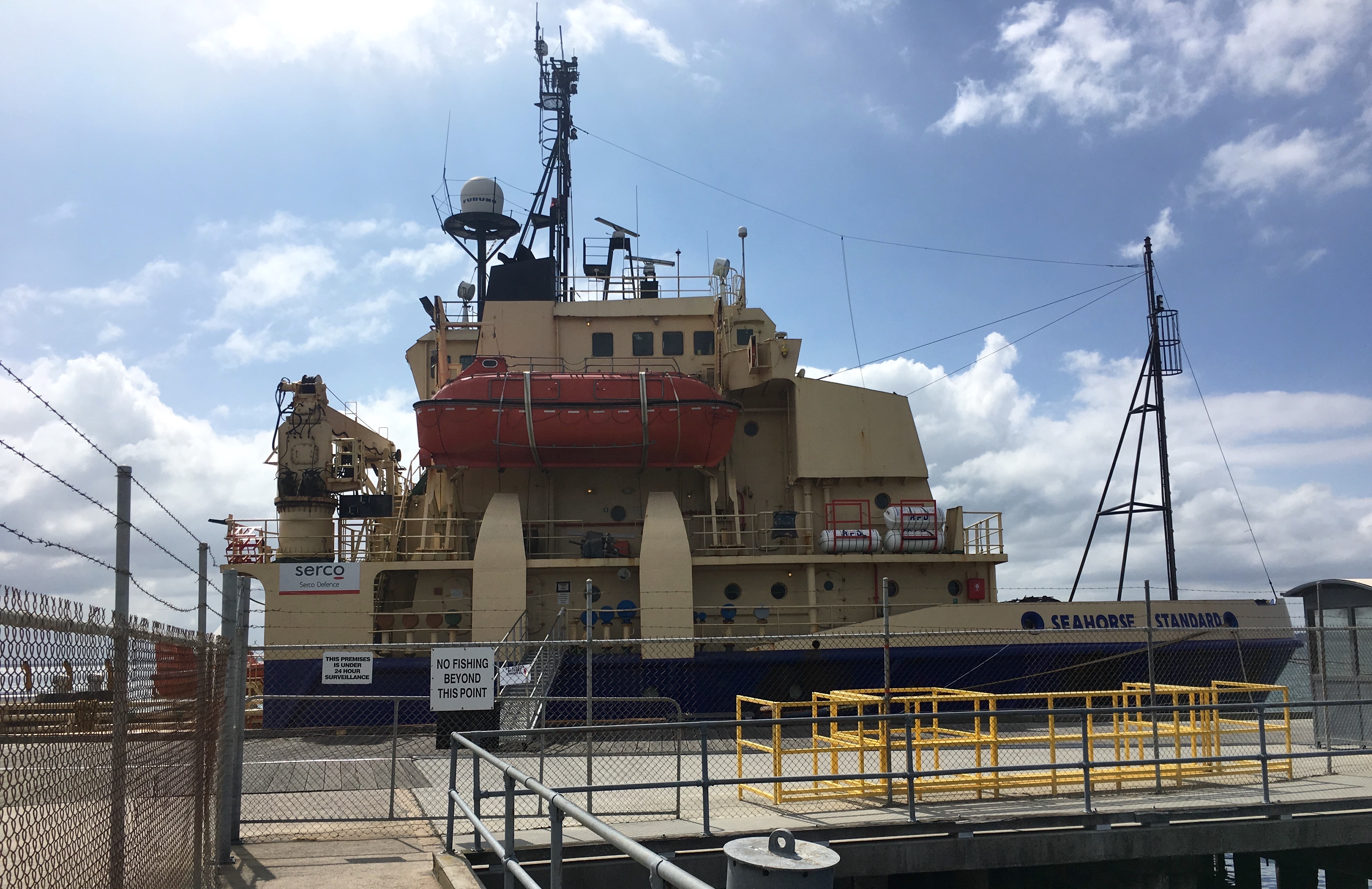
- Seahorse Standard docked at Stony Point, Victoria in March 2017

History
- Name: Balder Cabot (1981–1985); British Magnus (1985–1998)
- Operator: K/S Ocean Supply AS
- Builder: Marystown Shipyard, Marystown
- Yard number: 29
- Launched: 27 December 1980

History

Australia
- Name: Seahorse Standard
- Operator: DMS Maritime
- Identification: Call sign:VNFW; IMO number: 7623930; MMSI number: 503044000
- Fate: Scrapped 12 May 2018

General characteristics
- Displacement: 2090 tons
- Length: 72 m (236 ft)
- Beam: 16 m (52 ft)
- Draught: 4.2 m (14 ft)
- Speed: 10 knots (19 km/h; 12 mph)
- Armament: None

Seahorse Standard was a multi-purpose vessel operated by Defence Maritime Services under contract to the Royal Australian Navy (RAN). She was based at HMAS Stirling in Western Australia.

The vessel was engaged in March 2014 in the search for Malaysia Airlines Flight 370 in the South Indian Ocean.

As part of Seahorse Standard's duties while based at Stirling, she was tasked as the submarine escape and rescue support vessel.
