= TRV Tuna =

History

*Australia
- Name: TRV Tuna
- Namesake: The tuna
- Builder: Williamstown Dockyard, Victoria
- Completed: 1970
- In service: 1970–1988 (RAN); 1988– 2012 (DMS)
- Status: Decommissioned as of 2012

General characteristics
- Class & type: Fish-class torpedo recovery vessel
- Displacement: 94 long tons (96 t) full load
- Length: 26.8 metres (88 ft)
- Beam: 6.1 metres (20 ft)
- Draught: 1.1 metres (3 ft 7 in)
- Propulsion: 3 x V8 GM diesels, 890 horsepower (660 kW), 3 shafts
- Speed: 9.5 knots (17.6 km/h; 10.9 mph)
- Endurance: 63 hours at 8 knots (15 km/h; 9.2 mph)
- Crew: 9
- Sensors & processing systems: I-band navigational radar

TRV Tuna (801) was one of three Torpedo Recovery Vessels operated by the Royal Australian Navy (RAN) and Defence Maritime Services (DMS). Ordered in 1969, the vessel, originally identified as TRV 253, was completed in 1970 and assigned to the torpedo firing range at Jervis Bay. The ship received a name and the pennant number "TRV 801" in 1983. In 1988, the three vessels were sold to DMS. Tuna was assigned to the naval base at HMAS Creswell in Jervis Bay. Tuna was active in DMS service as of 2007.

== Design and construction ==
The class was ordered in 1969 as replacements for World War II-era torpedo recovery vessels.

The vessels each have a full load displacement of 94 long tons (96 t), a length of 26.8 metres (88 ft), a beam of 6.1 metres (20 ft), and a draught of 1.1 metres (3 ft 7 in). Propulsion machinery consists of three GM V8 diesels, which supply 890 horsepower (660 kW) to the three propeller shafts. Top speed is 9.5 knots (17.6 km/h; 10.9 mph), and the vessels have an endurance of 63 hours at 8 knots (15 km/h; 9.2 mph). Each Fish-class vessel can recover up to eight torpedoes via a watertight stern gate. They are unarmed, and their sensor suite is limited to an I-band navigational radar. Nine personnel make up the crew.

Three vessels were built at Williamstown Dockyard for the Royal Australian Navy, with TRV 253 completed in 1970.

== Operational history ==
On entering service, TRV 253 was assigned to the target range at Jervis Bay. In addition to torpedo recovery, the vessels were used as dive tenders and as training vessels for the Royal Australian Naval Reserve.

In 1983, the boats were named and redesignated, with TRV 253 become Tuna, with the pennant number "TRV 801".

In 1988, the three vessels were sold to DMS. As part of the company's role in providing maritime support for the RAN, Tuna was assigned to the nearby naval base HMAS Creswell. Tuna was still active with DMS as of 2007, but was no longer listed as active by 2012.
