= Torpedo trials craft =

Naval auxiliary vessels designed to support torpedo testing

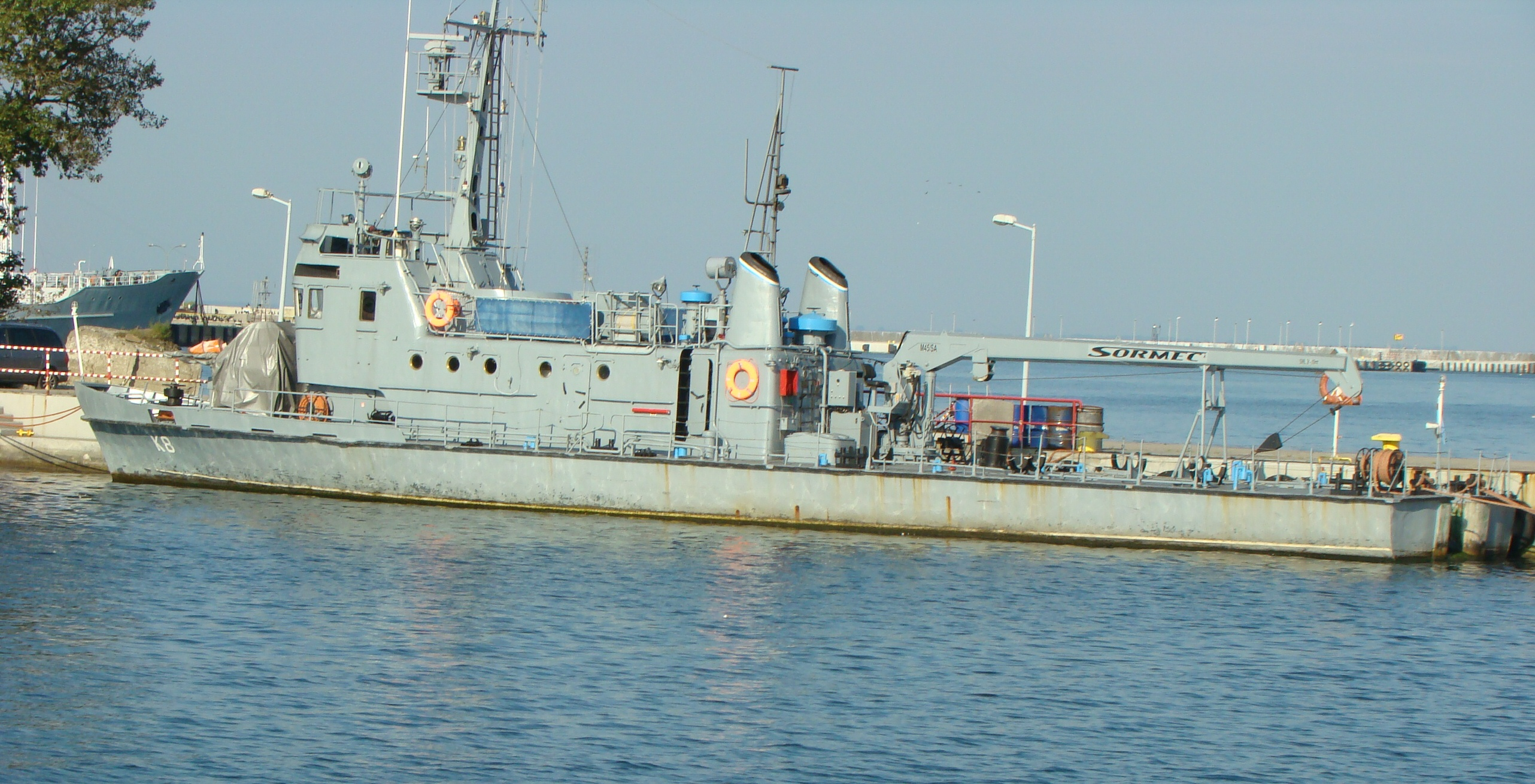
Polish torpedo recovery vessel K-8

Torpedo trials craft are primarily naval auxiliaries used by navies for the development of new naval torpedoes and during practise firings. These craft are designed to track and monitor the torpedo and to be able to locate and retrieve the spent torpedo for analysis, and refurbishment for reuse. Torpedo trials craft had their greatest use during the years around World War II when the torpedo was the primary anti-ship weapon of submarines, destroyers and naval aircraft.

Modern navies will usually not have ships dedicated to this one role, but have multirole underwater support vessels, which can undertake a variety of similar underwater roles, such as development and retrieval of naval mines, and remotely operated underwater vehicle and diver support.

A non naval example of such craft were the "Long Range Recovery and Support Craft" of the Royal Air Force which were used to retrieve aerial torpedoes used during training.

Even if a spent torpedo is of no further use, its recovery may be required to prevent the loss of technical information; for example torpedo development in the People's Republic of China, was greatly aided by the reverse engineering of American Mark 46 torpedoes retrieved by Chinese fishermen.

== Operators ==
- Royal Australian Navy
  - Tuna-class - 3 ships, all retired
- People's Liberation Army Navy
  - Type 906 - 1 ship, status unknown
  - Type 907A - 1 ship, status unknown
  - Type 803 - 6 ships, status unknown
  - Type 917 - 7 ships, all active
- Indian Navy
  - Astravahini-class - 3 ships, all retired
  - INS Astradharani - single ship class, active
- United States Navy
  - Cape Flattery-class - 2 ships, both active

== See also ==
- Yu-5 torpedo
- United States Navy torpedo retrievers
- List of yard and district craft of the United States Navy § Torpedo Trials Craft (YTT)
