= DMS Maritime =

Australian company

- Founded: 1997
- Founder: P&O Maritime Services; Serco
- Headquarters: Sydney, Australia
- Area served: Australia
- Parent: Serco
- Website: www.serco.com

DMS Maritime, formerly Defence Maritime Services, is a company providing port services to the Australian Defence Force and Marine Unit. It is a subsidiary of Serco.

== History ==
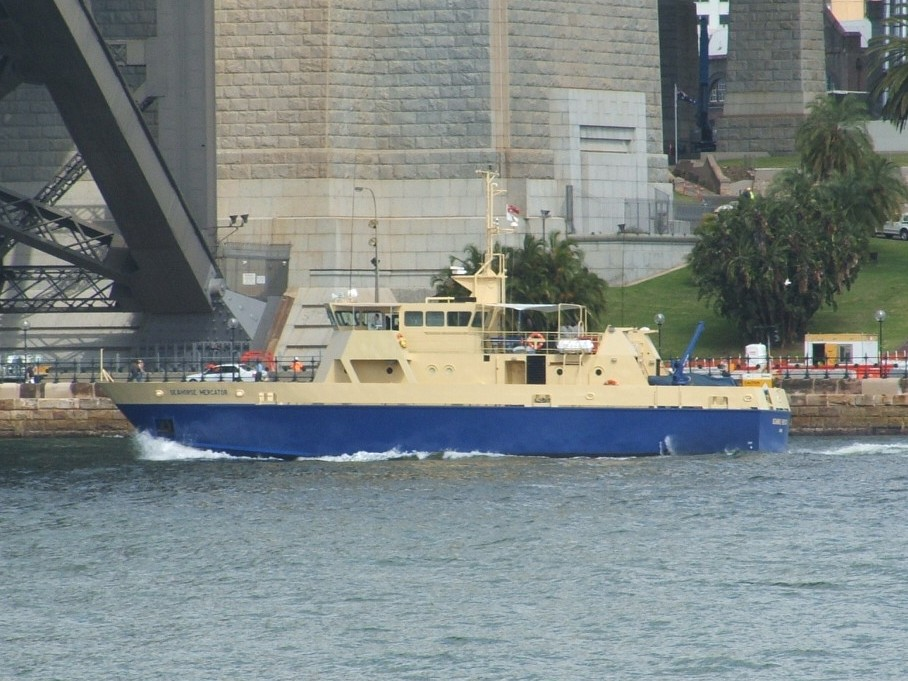
Seahorse Mercator on Sydney Harbour in August 2007

Defence Maritime Services was founded in 1997 as a 50:50 joint venture between P&O Maritime Services and Serco to fulfill a contract to organise tug boats and ferries and supply and maintain small boats for the Royal Australian Navy (RAN). In 2012, Serco bought out P&O's shareholding.

Headquartered in Sydney, it has operations in Cairns, Darwin, Dampier, Fremantle, Western Port, Jervis Bay and Sydney. It currently operates eight oceangoing vessels and over 100 harbour craft and has around 350 staff. The services DMS is contracted to provide to the RAN include operating tug boats and lighters at RAN bases, training members of the RAN, and maintaining RAN warships.

== Vessels operated ==
=== Auxiliaries ===
General-purpose tenders

- Seahorse Spirit
- Seahorse Standard

Both vessels have been retired and removed from DMS service.

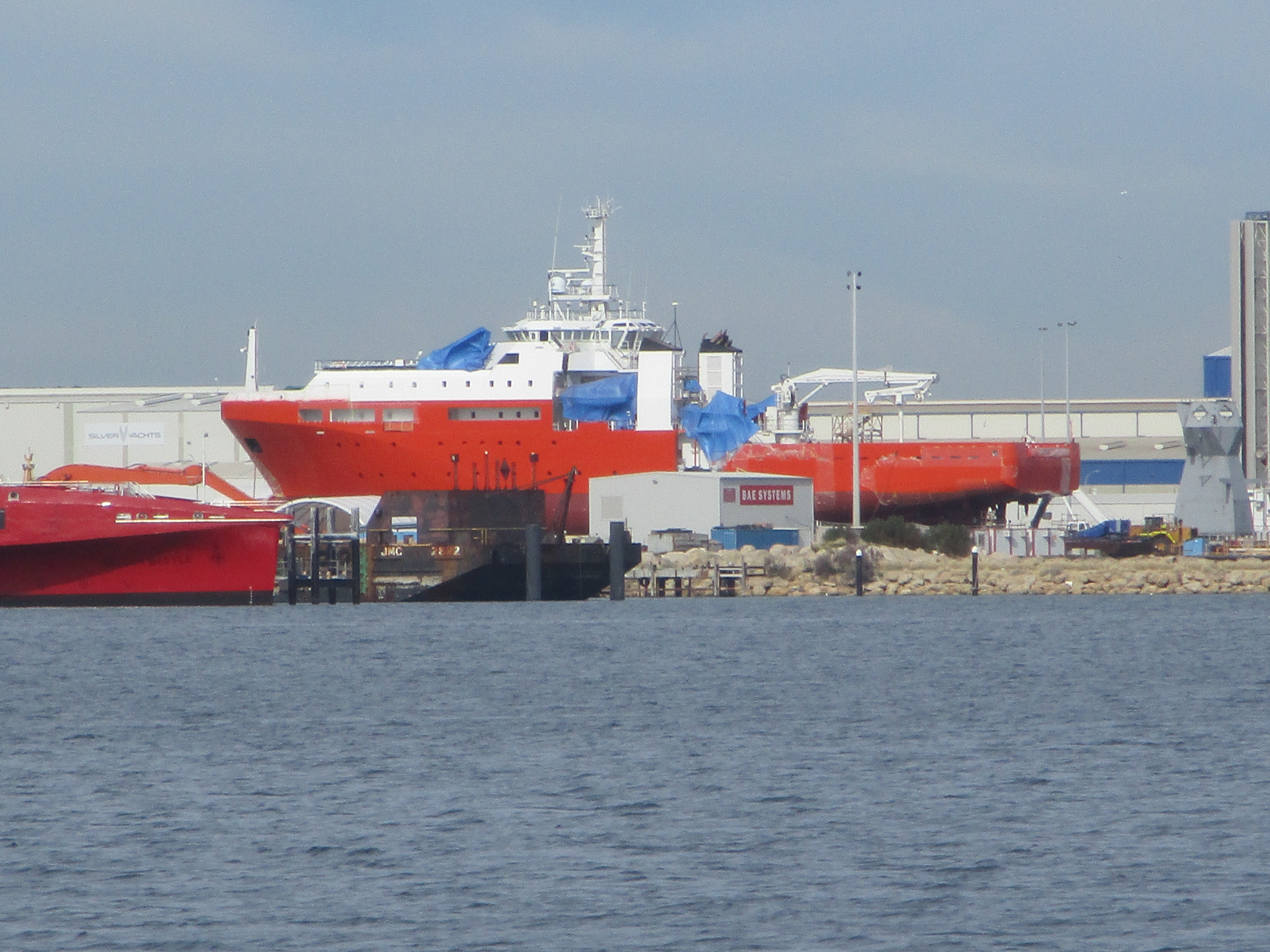
Besant at Henderson, Western Australia

Submarine rescue and escape ships

- Besant
- Stoker

=== Yard and service craft ===
60-ton flat-top lighters

- FTL 60101
- FTL 60102
- FTL 60103
- FTL 60104
- FTL 60105
- FTL 60107
- FTL 60108
- FTL 60109
- FTL 60110
- FTL 60111
- FTL 60112
- FTL 60113
- FTL 60114
- FTL 60115
- FTL 60116
- FTL 60117
- FTL 60118
- FTL 60119
- FTL 60120
- FTL 60121

Southerly 65 class diving tenders

- 2001 Dugong
- 2003 Seal
- 2004 Shark

Miscellaneous concrete ammunition lighters

- CAL 209
- CAL 5012
- CAL 10011
- CAL 10012
- CAL 10013
- CAL 10014

Wattle class crane stores lighters

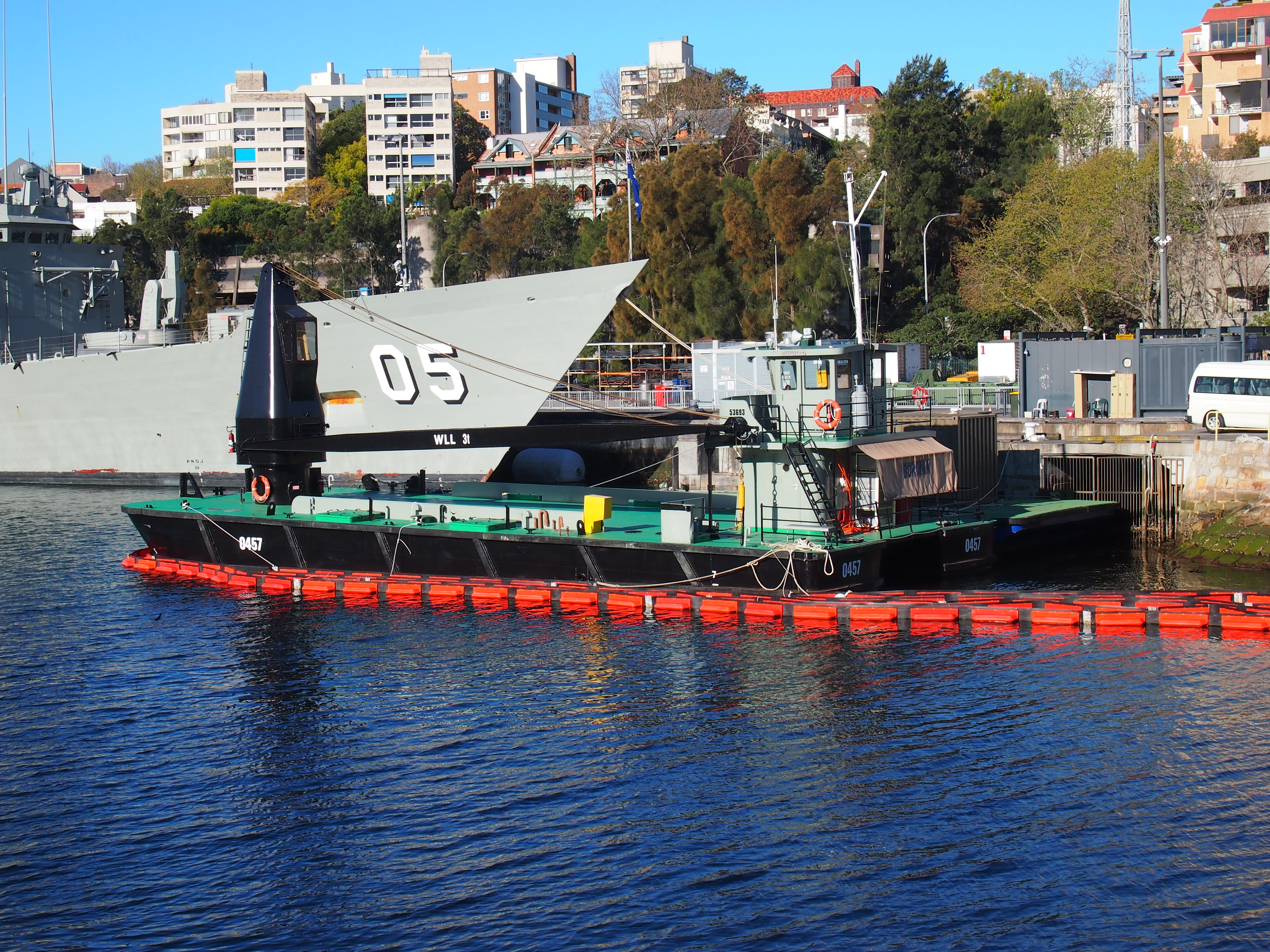
CSL 02 Boronia at Fleet Base East in September 2012

- CSL 01 Wattle
- CSL 02 Boronia
- CSL 03 Telopea

Steber 43 naval general purpose workboats

- NGPWB 01 Patonga
- NGPWB 02
- NGPWB 03
- NGPWB 04 Sea Dragon
- NGPWB 05
- NGPWB 06
- NGPWB 07
- NGPWB 08
- NGPWB 09 Sea Witch
- NGPWB 10

Noosacat 930 harbour personnel boats

- 0901
- 0902
- 0903
- 0904

Riviera class VIP launch

- 38103 Admiral Hudson

Admiral's barge

- AB 1201 Green Parrot

Shark Cat 800 harbour personnel boats

- 0801
- 0802
- 0803
- 0805

Naval work boats

- NWB 1230
- NWB 1260
- NWB 1281 Otter
- NWB 1282 Walrus
- NWB 1285 Grampus
- NWB 1286 Dolphin
- NWB 1287
- NWB 1288
- NWB 1289
- NWB 1290
- NWB 1291
- NWB 1292 Turtle

Halvorsen-design workboat

- AWB 4011

40-foot Mk 1 and 1963-design workboats

- AWB 404
- AWB 421
- AWB 423
- AWB 424
- AWB 436
- AWB 440
- AWB 1658
- AWB 4006
- AWB 4007

AWB Mod. II workboat

- 4010

AWB short and long group cabin workboats

- Amethyst
- 4002

7.2 metre rigid-hulled inflatable boats

- 27 RHIBS, numbered 0701 through 0727

Radio controlled surface targets

- RCST 06
- RCST 07
- RCST 08
- RCST 09
- RCST 10
- RCST 11

Wallaby-class water and fuel lighters

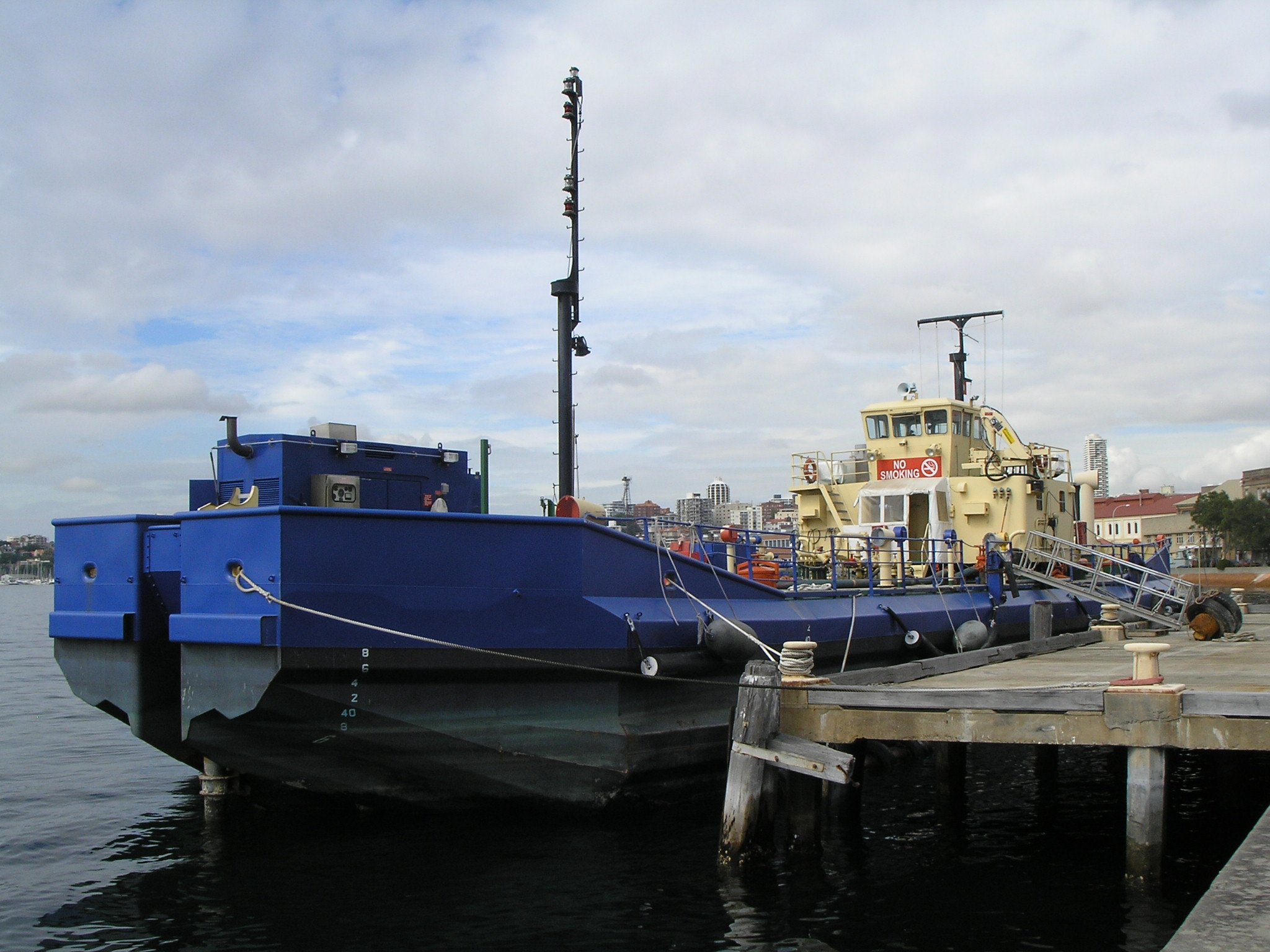
Wyulda at HMAS Kuttabul in February 2008

- Wallaby
- Wombat
- Warrigal
- Wyulda

All vessels have been retired and replaced by larger, newer and safer designed craft post-2017.

Torpedo recovery craft

- 446 Tuna
- 447 Trevally
- 448 Tailor

Withdrawn and no longer operated. Vessels have been sold to private owners.

Compact tug

- Tancred - Damen ASD Tug 2310

Tug/workboat

- Wattle - Damen Stan Tug 1606

Coastal tugs

- 2601 Tammar
- Seahorse Quenda
- Seahorse Chuditch
- Elwing - Damen Standard built ASD 2411
- Waree - Damen Standard built ASD 2411

Medium harbour tug

- 1801 Quokka

Bronzewing-class harbour tug

- Bronzewing
- Currawong
- Mollymawk

=== Training craft ===
Aviation training ship

- MV Sycamore (owned by DMS, crewed by Teekay)

Sail training craft

- 850576 Salthorse

Swarbrick III class small training yachts

- STY 3807 Alexander of Cresswell
- STY 3808 Friendship of Leeuwin
- STY 3809 Lady Peryhyn of Nirimba
- STY 3810 Charlotte of Cerberus
- STY 3811 Scarborough of Cerberus

Tasar sail dinghies

- 63 vessels, numbered between 1925 and 2546

ASI 315 class navigation and seamanship training craft

- Seahorse Mercator
