= List of ship commissionings in 1968 =

The list of ship commissionings in 1968 includes a chronological list of all ships commissioned in 1968.

	Operator	Ship	Flag	Class and type	Pennant	Other notes
14 January	Italian Navy	Alpino		Alpino-class frigate	F580	
24 January	Royal Australian Navy	Advance		Attack-class patrol boat	P 83	
9 February	Royal Australian Navy	Stalwart		Destroyer tender	A 215	
23 April	Royal Australian Navy	Otway		Oberon-class submarine	S 59	
26 April	Royal Australian Navy	Acute		Attack-class patrol boat	P 81	
27 April	United States Navy	Puget Sound		Samuel Gompers-class destroyer tender	AD-38	
28 April	Italian Navy	Carabiniere		Alpino-class frigate	F581	
11 May	United States Navy	Schofield		Brooke-class frigate	FFG-3	
15 May	Royal Australian Navy	Archer		Attack-class patrol boat	P 86	
15 May	Royal Netherlands Navy	Isaac Sweers		Van Speijk-class frigate	F814	
21 June	Royal Australian Navy	Aware		Attack-class patrol boat	P 91	
28 June	United States Navy	Hammerhead		Sturgeon-class submarine	SSN-663	
30 June	Black Sea Shipping Company	Shota Rustaveli	Soviet Union	Ivan Franko-class passenger ship		
12 July	Royal Australian Navy	Assail		Attack-class patrol boat	P 89	
13 July	United States Navy	O'Callahan		Garcia-class ocean escort	DE-1051	
16 August	Royal Australian Navy	Barbette		Attack-class patrol boat	P 97	
17 August	Royal Australian Navy	Adroit		Attack-class patrol boat	P 82	
7 September	United States Navy	John F. Kennedy		Modified Kitty Hawk-class aircraft carrier	CV-67	
19 October	United States Navy	Albert David		Garcia-class ocean escort	DE-1050	
19 October	United States Navy	Koelsch		Garcia-class ocean escort	DE-1049	
21 October	Royal Australian Navy	Ladava		Attack-class patrol boat	P 92	
26 October	Royal Australian Navy	Ardent		Attack-class patrol boat	P 84	
26 October	Royal Australian Navy	Barricade		Attack-class patrol boat	P 98	
26 October	United States Navy	Denver		Austin-class amphibious transport dock	LPD-9	
5 November	Royal Australian Navy	Bombard		Attack-class patrol boat	P 99	
16 November	United States Navy	New Orleans		Iwo Jima-class amphibious assault ship	LPH-11	
29 November	Royal Australian Navy	Madang		Attack-class patrol boat	P 94	
6 December	United States Navy	Gurnard		Sturgeon-class submarine	SSN-662	
14 December	Royal Australian Navy	Bandolier		Attack-class patrol boat	P 95	
