= List of ship launches in 1968 =

The list of ship launches in 1968 includes a chronological list of ships launched in 1968. In cases where no official launching ceremony was held, the date built or completed may be used instead.

Date	Ship	Class / type	Builder	Location	Country	Notes
23 January	Santa Barbara	Kilauea-class ammunition ship	Bethlehem Sparrows Point Shipyard	Sparrows Point, Maryland	United States	United States Navy.
25 January	Munster	Ferry	Nobiskrug	Rendsburg	West Germany	For British & Irish Steam Packet Co. Ltd.
27 January	Polar Uruguay	Polar-Ecuador-class reefer ship	Blohm+Voss	Hamburg	West Germany	For Hamburg Süd.
27 January	Amrum	Ferry	Husumer Schiffswerft	Husum	West Germany	For Amrumer Schiffahrts AG.
3 February	Adroit	Attack-class patrol boat			Australia	For Royal Australian Navy.
3 February	New Orleans	Iwo Jima-class amphibious assault ship	Philadelphia Naval Shipyard	Philadelphia, Pennsylvania	United States	For United States Navy.
3 February	Newport	Newport-class tank landing ship	Philadelphia Naval Shipyard	Philadelphia, Pennsylvania	United States	For United States Navy.
9 February	U 11	Type 205 submarine	Howaldtswerke-Deutsche Werft	Kiel	West Germany	For German Navy
10 February	Kronstadt	Project 1134A Berkut A large anti-submarine ship	Severnaya Verf	Leningrad	Soviet Union	For Soviet Navy
17 February	Arrow	Attack-class patrol boat			Australia	For Royal Australian Navy.
17 February	Bergall	Sturgeon-class submarine	Mare Island Naval Shipyard	Vallejo, California	United States	For United States Navy.
17 February	Lang	Knox-class frigate	Todd Shipyards	San Pedro, California	United States	For United States Navy.
24 February	Polar Paraguay	Polar-Ecuador-class reefer ship	Blohm+Voss	Hamburg	West Germany	For Hamburg Süd.
26 February	Norderney	tugboat	Schichau-Werft	Bremerhaven	West Germany	For German Navy
28 February	Charybdis	Leander-class frigate	Harland and Wolff	Govan	United Kingdom	For Royal Navy
29 February	Bacchante	Leander-class frigate			United Kingdom	For Royal Navy
29 February	Fawn	Bulldog-class survey vessel	Brooke Marine Ltd.	Lowestoft	United Kingdom	For Royal Navy.
February	Cachalote	Daphné-class submarine			France	For Portuguese Navy
February	Dhafeer	Dhafeer-class patrol craft	Keith, Nelson & Co.	Bembridge	United Kingdom	For United Arab Emirates Navy.
1 March	Seattle	Sacramento-class fast combat support ship	Puget Sound Naval Shipyard	Bremerton, Washington	United States	For United States Navy.
9 March	Insel Föhr	Ferry	Lübecker Flenderwerke	Rendsburg	West Germany	For Wyker Dampfschiffs-Reederei Amrum GmbH.
10 March	Malcolm Miller	Sail Training Ship	John Lewis & Sons	Aberdeen	United Kingdom	For Sail Training Association
15 March	Cherry Sand	Dredger	Appledore Shipbuilders Ltd.	Appledore	United Kingdom	For British Transport Docks Board.
15 March	Revenge	Resolution-class submarine	Cammell Laird	Birkenhead	United Kingdom	For Royal Navy
16 March	Wichita	Wichita-class replenishment oiler	Fore River Shipyard	Quincy, Massachusetts	United States	For United States Navy.
18 March	Suffolk Challenger	Fishing trawler	Appledore Shipbuilders Ltd.	Appledore	United Kingdom	For Small & Co (Lowestoft) Ltd.
19 March	William Allpress	Barge	J. Bolson & Son Ltd.	Poole	United Kingdom	For William Press Ltd.
20 March	K-87	Project 670 Skat submarine	Krasnoye Sormovo Factory No. 112	Nizhny Novgorod	Soviet Union	For Soviet Navy
29 March	Durham	Charleston-class amphibious cargo ship	Newport News Shipbuilding	Newport News, Virginia	United States	For United States Navy.
30 March	Puffer	Sturgeon-class submarine	Ingalls Shipbuilding	Pascagoula, Mississippi	United States	For United States Navy.
7 April	Canguro Bruno	Ferry		Castellammare di Stabia	Italy	For Navigazion Traghetti Sardi.
10 April	Barbette	Attack-class patrol boat			Australia	For Royal Australian Navy.
12 April	Whipple	Knox-class frigate	Todd Pacific Shipyards	Seattle, Washington	United States	For United States Navy.
13 April	San Diego	Mars-class combat stores ship	National Steel and Shipbuilding Company	San Diego, California	United States	For United States Navy.
13 April	Mölders	Lütjens-class destroyer	Bath Iron Works	Bath, Maine	United States	For German Navy
18 March	Suffolk Chieftain	Fishing trawler	Appledore Shipbuilders Ltd.	Appledore	United Kingdom	For Small & Co (Lowestoft) Ltd.
27 April	Ardent	Attack-class patrol boat			Australia	For Royal Australian Navy.
5 May	Anchorage	Anchorage-class dock landing ship	Ingalls Shipbuilding	Pascagoula, Mississippi	United States	For United States Navy.
11 May	Francis Hammond	Knox-class frigate	Todd Shipyards	San Pedro, California	United States	For United States Navy.
11 May	Export Lightning	Container ship	Bath Iron Works	Bath, Maine	United States	For American Export-Isbrandtsen Lines
14 May	Thara	Bulk carrier	Harland & Wolff	Belfast	United Kingdom	For Norwegian Bulk Carriers.
15 May	Edenton	Edenton-class salvage and rescue ship	Brooke Marine Ltd.	Lowestoft	United Kingdom	For United States Navy.
15 May	Spadefish	Sturgeon-class submarine	Newport News Shipbuilding	Newport News, Virginia	United States	For United States Navy.
May	Ghadunfar	Dhafeer-class patrol craft	Keith, Nelson & Co.	Bembridge	United Kingdom	For United Arab Emirates Navy.
May	Hazza	Dhafeer-class patrol craft	Keith, Nelson & Co.	Bembridge	United Kingdom	For United Arab Emirates Navy.
2 June	Smely	Project 61 destroyer			Soviet Union	For Soviet Navy
8 June	Dolphin	Unique research submarine	Portsmouth Naval Shipyard	Kittery, Maine	United States	For United States Navy.
10 June	Oilpress	Naval tanker	Appledore Shipbuilders Ltd.	Appledore	United Kingdom	For Royal Maritime Auxiliary Service.
15 June	Seahorse	Sturgeon-class submarine	Electric Boat	Groton, Connecticut	United States	For United States Navy.
28 June	Hangor	Daphné-class submarine	St. W	Brest	France	For Pakistani Navy}
29 June	Barricade	Attack-class patrol boat			Australia	For Royal Australian Navy.
11 July	K-120	Project 651 submarine	Krasnoye Sormovo Factory No. 112	Nizhny Novgorod	Soviet Union	For Soviet Navy
10 June	Oilstone	Naval tanker	Appledore Shipbuilders Ltd.	Appledore	United Kingdom	For Royal Maritime Auxiliary Service.
25 June	G.W.132	Barge	Appledore Shipbuilders Ltd.	Appledore	United Kingdom	For Wimpey (Marine) Ltd.
17 July	Mount Hood	Kilauea-class ammunition ship	Bethlehem Sparrows Point Shipyard	Sparrows Point, Maryland	United States	For United States Navy.
20 July	Connole	Knox-class frigate	Avondale Shipyard	Avondale, Louisiana	United States	For United States Navy.
25 July	Natsugumo	Minegumo-class destroyer			Japan	For Japanese Navy
27 July	Zinnia	Bulk carrier	John Readhead & Sons Ltd.	South Shields	United Kingdom	For Stag Line.
27 July	Guitarro	Sturgeon-class submarine	Mare Island Naval Shipyard	Vallejo, California	United States	For United States Navy.
31 July	K-25	Project 670 Skat submarine	Krasnoye Sormovo Factory No. 112	Nizhny Novgorod	Soviet Union	For Soviet Navy
3 August	Trenton	Austin-class amphibious transport dock	Lockheed Shipbuilding and Construction Company	Seattle, Washington	United States	For United States Navy.
8 August	Scylla	Leander-class frigate	HMNB Plymouth	Plymouth	United Kingdom	For Royal Navy
9 August	Skaufast	Bulk carrier	Harland & Wolff	Belfast	United Kingdom	For Norwegian Bulk Carriers.
10 August	Madang	Attack-class patrol boat			Australia	For Royal Australian Navy.
30 August	Protecteur	Protecteur-class replenishment oiler	Saint John Shipbuilding	Saint John, New Brunswick	Canada	For Royal Canadian Navy
3 September	Sherman	Hamilton-class cutter	Avondale Shipyard	Westwego, Louisiana	United States	For United States Coast Guard
5 September	Lockwood	Knox-class frigate	Todd Pacific Shipyards	Seattle, Washington	United States	For United States Navy.
5 September	Oilfield	Naval tanker	Appledore Shipbuilders Ltd.	Appledore	United Kingdom	For Royal Maritime Auxiliary Service.
10 September	U 12	Type 205 submarine	Howaldtswerke-Deutsche Werft	Kiel	West Germany	For German Navy
10 September	Narhvalen	Type 205 submarine	Orlogsværftet	Copenhagen	Denmark	For Royal Danish Navy
14 September	Buccaneer	Attack-class patrol boat			Australia	For Royal Australian Navy.
25 September	Cave Sand	Dredger	Appledore Shipbuilders Ltd.	Appledore	United Kingdom	For British Transport Docks Board.
28 September	Fresno	Newport-class tank landing ship	National Steel and Shipbuilding Company	San Diego, California	United States	For United States Navy.
28 September	Torrens	River-class destroyer escort	Vickers Cockatoo Docks	Sydney	Australia	For Royal Australian Navy.
29 September	K-318	Project 651 submarine	Krasnoye Sormovo Factory No. 112	Nizhny Novgorod	Soviet Union	For Soviet Navy
September	Delfim	Albacora-class submarine			France	For Portuguese Navy
2 October	Bandolier	Attack-class patrol boat			Australia	For Royal Australian Navy.
7 October	B-413	Project 641 submarine	Sudomekh Shipyard	Leningrad	Soviet Union	For Soviet Navy
7 October	G.W.133	Barge	Appledore Shipbuilders Ltd.	Appledore	United Kingdom	For Wimpey (Marine) Ltd.
7 October	P.A.S. 1505	Tank barge	Appledore Shipbuilders Ltd.	Appledore	United Kingdom	For Royal Maritime Auxiliary Service.
19 October	Mobile	Charleston-class amphibious cargo ship	Newport News Shipbuilding	Newport News, Virginia	United States	For United States Navy.
24 October	Arashio	Asashio-class submarine			Japan	For Japanese Navy
24 October	Suffolk Crusader	Fishing trawler	Appledore Shipbuilders Ltd.	Appledore	United Kingdom	For Small & Co (Lowestoft) Ltd.
October	Durgham	Dhafeer-class patrol craft	Keith, Nelson & Co.	Bembridge	United Kingdom	For United Arab Emirates Navy.
October	Timsah	Dhafeer-class patrol craft	Keith, Nelson & Co.	Bembridge	United Kingdom	For United Arab Emirates Navy.
2 November	Stag Hound	Container ship	Bath Iron Works	Bath, Maine	United States	For American Export-Isbrandtsen Lines
6 November	Bayonet	Attack-class patrol boat			Australia	For Royal Australian Navy.
6 November	Sand Swift	Dredger	J. Bolson & Son Ltd.	Poole	United Kingdom	For South Coast Shipping Co. Ltd.
16 November	Rush	Hamilton-class cutter	Avondale Shipyard	Westwego, Louisiana	United States	For United States Coast Guard.
21 November	Achilles	Leander-class frigate	Yarrow Shipbuilders	Scotstoun	United Kingdom	For Royal Navy
21 November	Oilbird	Naval tanker	Appledore Shipbuilders Ltd.	Appledore	United Kingdom	For Royal Maritime Auxiliary Service.
22 November	Admiral Isakov	Project 1134A Berkut A large anti-submarine ship			Soviet Union	For Soviet Navy
23 November	Peoria	Newport-class tank landing ship	National Steel and Shipbuilding Company	San Diego, California	United States	For United States Navy.
30 November	Transcontainer I	Combined RO-RO ferry and container ship	Constructions industrielles de la Méditerranée	La Seyne-sur-Mer	France	For SNCF
1 December	Roll-on/roll-off vessel	For Moore-McCormack Lines	Ingalls Shipbuilding	Pascagoula, Mississippi	United States	
3 December	Onslow	Oberon-class submarine			United Kingdom	For Royal Australian Navy.
7 December	Badger	Knox-class frigate	Todd Shipyards	San Pedro, California	United States	For United States Navy.
7 December	Finback	Sturgeon-class submarine	Newport News Shipbuilding	Newport News, Virginia	United States	For United States Navy
7 December	Innisfallen	Ferry	Nobiskrug	Rendsburg	West Germany	For British & Irish Steam Packet Co, Ltd.
17 December	Niedersachsen	Ferry	Stader Schiffswerft	Stade	(West Germany)	For Reederei und Schiffahrts GmbH Grüne Küstenstraße.
20 December	Churchill	Churchill-class submarine			United Kingdom	For Royal Navy.
21 December	Beaufort	Edenton-class salvage and rescue ship	Brooke Marine Ltd.	Lowestoft	United Kingdom	For United States Navy.
26 December	K-162	Project 661 Anchar submarine			Soviet Union	For Soviet Navy
Unknown date	Hopper Barge No. 4	Dredger	American Marine & Machinery Company.	Paisley	United Kingdom	For Calcutta Port Trust.
Unknown date	Kojima Maru	Cargo ship			Japan	
Unknown date	Loach	Motor barge	Bay Wharf Construction Co. Ltd.	Greenwich	United Kingdom	For London & Rochester Trading Co. Ltd.
Unknown date	Wheelsman	Tanker	Clelands Shipbuilding Co. Ltd.	Wallsend	United Kingdom	For c. Rowbotham & Sons Ltd.
Unknown date	Unnamed	Dredger	J. Bolson & Son Ltd.	Poole	United Kingdom	For Yarmouth Harbour Commissioners.
Unknown date	3 unnamed vessels	Barges	Alabama Drydock and Shipbuilding Company	Mobile, Alabama	United States	For private owners.
