= 1st Fleet Patrol Ship Force =

1st Fleet Patrol Ship Force 1st Fleet Command
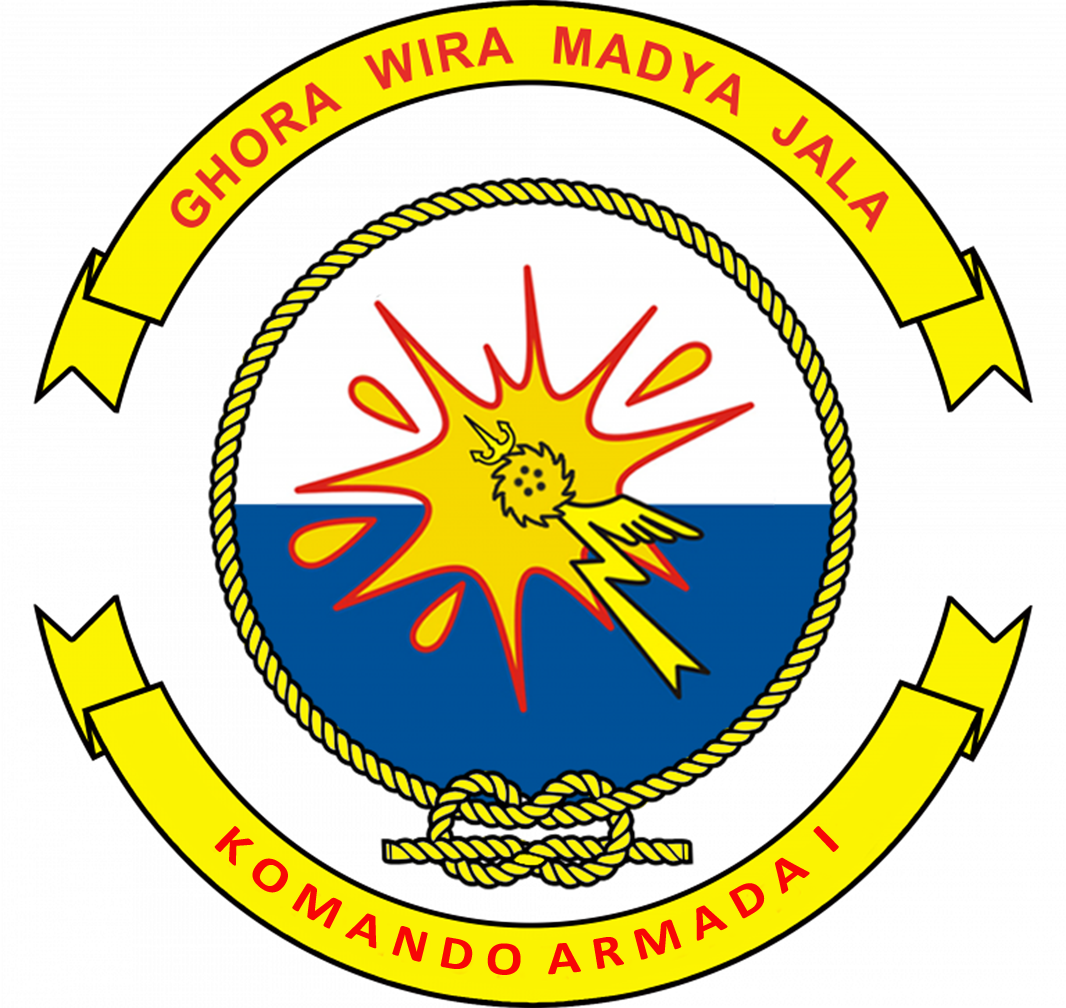
- Country: Indonesia
- Branch: Indonesian Navy
- Type: Patrol Ship Force
- Size: 62 ships
- Part of: 1st Fleet Command
- Naval Base: Belawan, Medan
- Website: www.koarmabar.tnial.mil.id

The 1st Fleet Patrol Ship Force (Indonesian: Satuan Kapal Patroli Komando Armada I abbreviated as Satrol Koarmada I) is part of the Indonesian 1st Fleet Sea Security Group Operations Unit and the Command for operational development under the 1st Fleet Command. The 1st Fleet Patrol Ship Force is responsible for developing the strength and combat capability of at least 32 warships under its command in the fields of maritime security, limited surface warfare, and limited air defense warfare. It also conducts personnel development to improve the skills and professionalism of its soldiers, as well as training development to enhance the combat readiness of its elements.

== Liquidation ==
The Indonesian Navy carried out the liquidation of the Fleet Patrol Ship Force and the Naval Base Maritime Security Unit. This involved the establishment of the Main Naval Base Patrol Ship Unit, as well as the creation of the Maritime Potential Staff of the Navy's Main Command and the Main Naval Base, centralized under the 1st Fleet Command. These changes were marked by the inauguration ceremony of the Maritime Potential Staff of the Fleet and the Main Naval Base, the confirmation of the Assistant/Director of the Maritime Potential Staff of the Navy's Main Command, the liquidation of the Fleet Command Patrol Ship Unit and the Main Naval Base Sea Security Unit, the inauguration of the Main Naval Base Patrol Ship Unit, and the confirmation of the Commander of the Main Naval Base Patrol Ship Unit. Chief of Staff of the Indonesian Navy, Admiral Ade Supandi, acted as the inspector of the ceremony, which took place on January 22, 2018, at the Sunda Pier, Koarmada I Unit Complex, Pondok Dayung, Tanjung Priok, North Jakarta.

== Orde of Battle ==
Class	Picture	Ships	Origin	Note
FPB-57 class		KRI Barakuda (814)	Germany; Indonesia	In active service. Variant of Albatros-class design.
KRI Pulau Rote		KRI Kelabang (826); KRI Kala Hitam (828)	East Germany	In active service. ex-Kondor II class
Krait class	Krait-class	KRI Krait (827)	Indonesia	In active service. Built by Fasharkan TNI AL Mentigi with assistance from PT. Batam Expresindo Shipyard.
Sibarau class	KRI	KRI Siliman (848); KRI Sigalu (857); KRI Silea (858); KRI Siribua (859); KRI Siada (862); KRI Sikuda (863); KRI Sigurot (864); KRI Tenggiri (865)	Australia	In active service. ex-Attack-class patrol boat of Australia navy.
Pari class	KRI Torani	KRI Sembilang (850); KRI Cakalang (852); KRI Kurau (856); KRI Torani (860); KRI Lepu (861); KRI Bubara (868); KRI Karotang (872)	Indonesia	In active service. Designated as PC-40M (Patroli Cepat 40M or Fast Patrol 40M). Patrol boat version (without C-705 missile) of Clurit-class. Built by PT. Palindo Marine, PT. Caputra Mitra Sejati, PT. Citra Shipyard & PT. Karimun Anugrah Sejati.
Cucut class	KRI Cucut	KRI Cucut (866)	Singapore	In active service. ex-RSS Jupiter diving support ship of Singapore Navy.
Dorang class		KRI Tuna (876)	Indonesia	In active service. Designated as PC-60M (Patroli Cepat 60M or Fast Patrol 60M).
Boa class	Kriwelang	KAL Boa; KAL Welang; KAL Sanca; KAL Kobra; KAL Anakonda; KAL Viper	Indonesia	PC-36m & PC-40m patrol boats made of fiberglass. Used to be known as Boa class (PC-36m), Kobra class (PC-36m), Viper class (PC-40m) & Tarihu class (PC-40m) while still bear KRI prefixes. Constructed by Fasharkan TNI AL Manokwari, Fasharkan TNI AL Jakarta, Fasharkan TNI AL Makassar & Fasharkan TNI AL Mentigi (Tanjung Pinang).
PC-28m class		KAL Mansalar; KAL Pohawang; KAL Ratu Samban; KAL Sambas; KAL Enggano; KAL Simeulue; KAL Balongan; KAL Jemur; KAL Panda; KAL Sinyaru; KAL Belinyu; KAL Baruk; KAL Telaga Tujuh; KAL Tamposo	Indonesia	PC-28m patrol boats made of fiberglass built by Fasharkan TNI AL Mentigi since 1993.
Bireuen class		KAL Bireuen; KAL Nipa; KAL Mapor	Indonesia	PC-28m patrol boats made of aluminium built by PT. Palindo Marine.
KAL-28m class	KAL (II-2-15)	KAL Pulau Siantan; KAL Pulau Mego; KAL Pulau Siba; KAL Marapas; KAL Lemukutan; KAL Pulau Bungaran; KAL Iboih; KAL Sorake; KAL Talise; KAL Lalos; KAL Anyer; KAL Pelawan; KAL Pandang; KAL Sarudik; KAL Hinako	Indonesia	PC-28m patrol boats made of aluminium built by PT. Tesco Indomaritim, PT. Palindo Marine, PT. Infinity Global Mandiri, PT. Lims Nautical Shipyard & PT. Steadfast Marine.
Sinabang class	KAL Sinabang	KAL Sinabang; KAL Sengiap	Indonesia	KAL-28m patrol boat made of aluminium with water jet propulsion, built by PT. Tesco Indomaritim circa 2013.
Combat Boat 18m class	Patkamla Bali (I-5-36) Patkamla Pulau Langkai	KAL Kilat	Indonesia	KAL Kilat were built by PT Infinity Global Mandiri and used by Kopaska special forces group, special boat unit of the 1st, 2nd & 3rd fleet respectively.
