= LAE =

LAE may refer to:

- Local area emergency, by Specific Area Message Encoding
- Least absolute errors, an alternate name for least absolute deviations in statistics
- Loterías y Apuestas del Estado, Spanish lottery
- Popular Unity (Greece) (Greek: Λαϊκή Ενότητα, Laïkí Enótita), a left-wing political party in Greece
- Lae, the capital of Morobe Province and the second-largest city in Papua New Guinea
- Lae Nadzab Airport, IATA code LAE
- Lae Airfield, former IATA code LAE
- Lae Atoll, atoll in the Marshall Islands
- HMAS Lae, two Australian warships
- LAE-32 (D-Lysergic acid ethylamide), a derivative of ergine
- Lae language, also known as Aribwatsa, an extinct member of the Busu subgroup of Lower Markham languages in the area of Lae, Morobe Province, Papua New Guinea
- Left atrial enlargement, enlargement of the left atrium (LA) of the heart and a form of cardiomegaly
