= P85 =

P85 may refer to:

- ARA Intrépida (P-85), a fast attack craft of the Argentine Navy
- HMAS Samarai (P 85), a patrol boat of the Royal Australian Navy
- McDonnell XP-85, an American prototype fighter aircraft
- Papyrus 85, a biblical manuscript
- PIK3R2, phosphatidylinositol 3-kinase regulatory subunit beta
- Ruger P85, a pistol
- Tesla Model S P85, an American automobile
- Yamaha P-85, a digital piano
- P85, a state regional road in Latvia
