= P98 =

P98 may refer to:

- HMAS Barricade (P 98), a patrol boat of the Royal Australian Navy
- Papyrus 98, a biblical manuscript
- P98, a state regional road in Latvia
