= P99 =

P99 may refer to:

- Embraer P-99, a Brazilian maritime patrol aircraft
- Ferguson P99, a Formula One racing car
- HMAS Bombard (P 99), a patrol boat of the Royal Australian Navy
- HMS Poseidon (P99), a submarine of the Royal Navy
- Papyrus 99, a biblical manuscript
- Walther P99, a pistol
- P99, a NIOSH air filtration rating
- P99, a state regional road in Latvia
- P99, a terminal introduced in 1976 by Northgate Information Solutions
- P99, the 99th percentile
