= P97 (disambiguation) =

p97 is an enzyme that in humans is encoded by the VCP gene.

P97 may also refer to:

- HMAS Barbette (P 97), a patrol boat of the Royal Australian Navy
- Papyrus 97, a biblical manuscript
- Ruger P97, a pistol
- P97, a state regional road in Latvia
