= P92 =

P92 may refer to:

== Aircraft ==
- Boulton Paul P.92, a prototype British ground attack aircraft
- Convair XP-92, an experimental American interceptor
- Tecnam P92, an Italian light sport aircraft

== Other uses ==
- HMAS Ladava (P 92), a patrol boat of the Royal Australian Navy
- Papyrus 92, a biblical manuscript
- P92, a state regional road in Latvia
