= HMAS Lae =

Two ships of the Royal Australian Navy have been named HMS Lae for the town of Lae in New Guinea.

- HMAS Lae (L3035), a Mark III Tank Landing Ship acquired in 1946 and placed into reserve later that year. She was sold for scrap in 1955, but she ran aground while being towed to the scrapyard and was abandoned.
- HMAS Lae (P 93), an Attack-class patrol boat launched in 1967, and transferred to the Papua New Guinea Defence Force in 1974.
