= HMAS Lae (P 93) =

Australian, then PNG, naval vessel

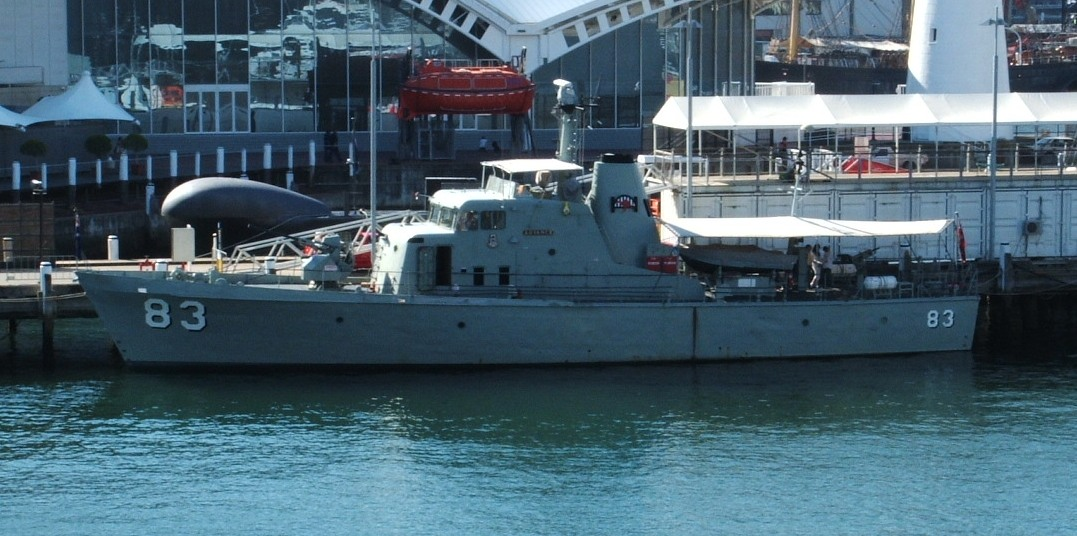
- HMAS Advance, a sister ship to Lae

History

Australia
- Namesake: City of Lae, Papua New Guinea
- Builder: Walkers Limited
- Launched: 5 October 1967
- Commissioned: 3 April 1968
- Decommissioned: 14 November 1974
- Fate: Transferred to Papua New Guinea

Papua New Guinea
- Commissioned: 14 November 1974
- Decommissioned: 1988
- Fate: Unknown

General characteristics
- Class & type: Attack-class patrol boat
- Displacement: 100 tons standard; 146 tons full load
- Length: 107.6 ft (32.8 m) length overall
- Beam: 20 ft (6.1 m)
- Draught: 6.4 ft (2.0 m) at standard load; 7.3 ft (2.2 m) at full load
- Propulsion: 2 × 16-cylinder Paxman YJCM diesel engines; 3,460 shp (2,580 kW); 2 shafts
- Speed: 24 knots (44 km/h; 28 mph)
- Range: 1,200 nmi (2,200 km; 1,400 mi) at 13 knots (24 km/h; 15 mph)
- Complement: 3 officers, 16 sailors
- Armament: 1 × Bofors 40 mm gun; 2 × .50-calibre M2 Browning machine guns; Small arms

HMAS Lae (P 93) was an Attack-class patrol boat of the Royal Australian Navy (RAN). It was named for the city of Lae, capital of Morobe Province, Papua New Guinea. Completed in 1968, the vessel was one of five assigned to the RAN's Papua New Guinea (PNG) Division. The patrol boat was transferred to the Papua New Guinea Defence Force in 1974 as HMPNGS Lae. She remained in service until 1988.

== Design and construction ==
The Attack class was ordered in 1964 to operate in Australian waters as patrol boats (based on lessons learned through using the Ton-class minesweepers on patrols of Borneo during the Indonesia-Malaysia Confrontation, and to replace a variety of old patrol, search-and-rescue, and general-purpose craft. Initially, fourteen were ordered for the RAN, five of which were intended for the Papua New Guinea Division of the RAN, although another six ships were ordered to bring the class to twenty vessels.

The patrol boats had a displacement of 100 tons at standard load and 146 tons at full load, were 107.6 feet (32.8 m) in length overall, had a beam of 20 feet (6.1 m), and draughts of 6.4 feet (2.0 m) at standard load, and 7.3 feet (2.2 m) at full load. Propulsion machinery consisted of two 16-cylinder Paxman YJCM diesel engines, which supplied 3,460 shaft horsepower (2,580 kW) to the two propellers. The vessels could achieve a top speed of 24 knots (44 km/h; 28 mph), and had a range of 1,200 nautical miles (2,200 km; 1,400 mi) at 13 knots (24 km/h; 15 mph). The ship's company consisted of three officers and sixteen sailors. Main armament was a bow-mounted Bofors 40 mm gun, supplemented by two .50-calibre M2 Browning machine guns and various small arms. The ships were designed with as many commercial components as possible: the Attacks were to operate in remote regions of Australia and New Guinea, and a town's hardware store would be more accessible than home base in a mechanical emergency.

Lae was built by Walkers Limited of Maryborough, Queensland, launched on 5 October 1967, and commissioned on 3 April 1968.

== Operational history ==
Primary roles of the new patrol boats were fisheries protection and sea training, but also undertook search and rescue, medical evacuation and monitoring of navigational aids roles. The ship's company was made up of both Australian and PNG servicemen. Prior to the arrival of the Attack-class patrol boats, surveillance of PNG waters was conducted by small coastal craft and occasional visits by larger RAN warships, but the PNG Division was now able to chase and apprehend vessels suspected of illegal fishing. The first arrest of a foreign fishing vessel by the new patrol boats was made by Lae in November 1968 when they responded to a radio report and surprised the Taiwanese Chin Hong Ming. The vessel was boarded and escorted to Medang.

In January 1970, Lae responded to rescue operations in the Whitsunday Islands when they were hit by Cyclone Ada. Over three days, the patrol boat battle large seas delivering medical supplies to islands and evacuating injured people, including tourists from Hayman Island at the height of the storm. The vessel's commander, Lieutenant John Scott, RAN, was awarded an MBE for leadership during the rescue efforts, while two other personnel, CPO Kenneth William Matters and RO J Sehi were awarded the BEM.

While on patrol in July 1970, Lae struck a shallow reef and was pulled off with the aid of sister ships Aitape and Samarai, fortunately suffering little damage.

Lae was one of the five Attack-class patrol boats of the RAN PNG Division transferred to the Papua New Guinea Defence Force's (PNGDF) Maritime Element (now Maritime Operations Element) on 14 November 1974 when the PNGDF took over maritime functions from the RAN. They formed the PNGDF Patrol Boat Squadron based at Manus. Lae was decommissioned in 1988.
