= HMAS Bayonet =

Attack-class patrol boat of the Royal Australian Navy

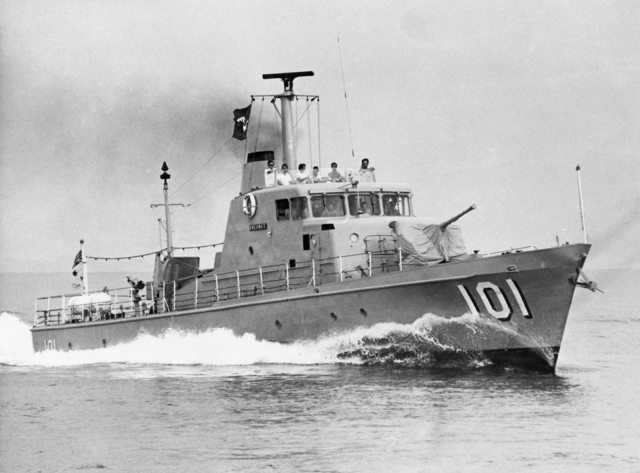
- Royal Australian Navy Attack-class patrol boat HMAS Bayonet (101) underway at sea.

History

Australia
- Builder: Evans Deakin and Company
- Laid down: October 1968
- Launched: 6 November 1968
- Commissioned: 22 February 1969
- Decommissioned: 26 June 1988
- Reclassified: Reserve (27 March 1982)
- Motto: "We Fix"
- Fate: Scuttled
- Badge

General characteristics
- Class & type: Attack-class patrol boat
- Displacement: 100 tons standard; 146 tons full load
- Length: 107.6 ft (32.8 m) length overall
- Beam: 20 ft (6.1 m)
- Draught: 6.4 ft (2.0 m) at standard load; 7.3 ft (2.2 m) at full load
- Propulsion: 2 × 16-cylinder Paxman YJCM diesel engines; 3,460 shp (2,580 kW); 2 shafts
- Speed: 24 knots (44 km/h; 28 mph)
- Range: 1,200 nmi (2,200 km; 1,400 mi) at 13 knots (24 km/h; 15 mph)
- Complement: 3 officers, 16 sailors
- Armament: 1 × Bofors 40 mm gun; 2 × .50-calibre M2 Browning machine guns; Small arms

HMAS Bayonet (P 101) was an Attack-class patrol boat of the Royal Australian Navy (RAN).

== Design and construction ==
The Attack class was ordered in 1964 to operate in Australian waters as patrol boats (based on lessons learned through using the Ton-class minesweepers on patrols of Borneo during the Indonesia-Malaysia Confrontation, and to replace a variety of old patrol, search-and-rescue, and general-purpose craft. Initially, nine were ordered for the RAN, with another five for Papua New Guinea's Australian-run coastal security force, although another six ships were ordered to bring the class to twenty vessels. The patrol boats had a displacement of 100 tons at standard load and 146 tons at full load, were 107.6 feet (32.8 m) in length overall, had a beam of 20 feet (6.1 m), and draughts of 6.4 feet (2.0 m) at standard load, and 7.3 feet (2.2 m) at full load. Propulsion machinery consisted of two 16-cylinder Paxman YJCM diesel engines, which supplied 3,460 shaft horsepower (2,580 kW) to the two propellers. The vessels could achieve a top speed of 24 knots (44 km/h; 28 mph), and had a range of 1,200 nautical miles (2,200 km; 1,400 mi) at 13 knots (24 km/h; 15 mph). The ship's company consisted of three officers and sixteen sailors. Main armament was a bow-mounted Bofors 40 mm gun, supplemented by two .50-calibre M2 Browning machine guns and various small arms. The ships were designed with as many commercial components as possible: the Attacks were to operate in remote regions of Australia and New Guinea, and a town's hardware store would be more accessible than home base in a mechanical emergency.

Bayonet was laid down by Walkers Limited at Maryborough, Queensland in October 1968, launched on 6 November 1968, and commissioned on 22 February 1969.

== Operational history ==
Bayonet was transferred to the Melbourne Port Division of the Royal Australian Naval Reserve on 27 March 1982.

== Fate ==
Bayonet paid off on 26 June 1988. Although the vessel was retained by the Australian government, by 1999 she was in a dilapidated condition, so was scuttled on 21 September 1999, sinking off Cape Schanck, Victoria in Bass Strait, in an area known to divers as the Victorian Ships' Graveyard.

The wreck lies upright on the sand at a depth of 82 metres (269 ft). Sand ripples around the wreck are evidence of strong currents in the area. The deck is at an average depth of 70 metres (230 ft). There is a hole in the foredeck at the forward gun position, and there is a substantial amount of wiring still present inside the wreck which may be an entanglement hazard. Dives on he Bayonet require the use of trimix to limit nitrogen narcosis.

Latitude: 38° 43.050′ S, Longitude: 144° 35.250′ E, Datum: WGS84
