= HMAS Samarai =

Australian, then PNG, naval vessel

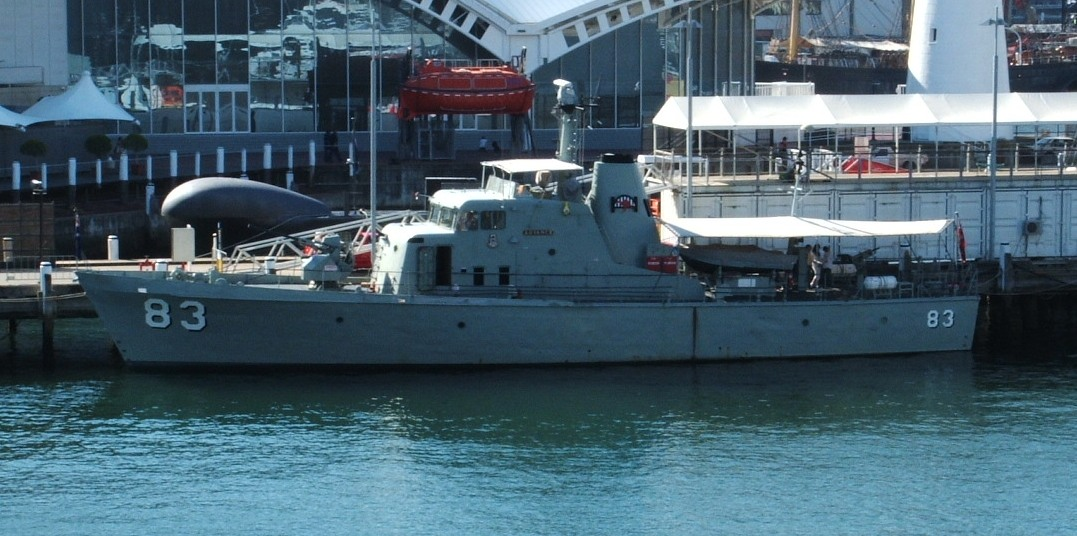
- HMAS Advance, a sister ship to Samarai

History

Australia
- Namesake: Island and town of Samarai, Papua New Guinea
- Builder: Evans Deakin and Company
- Launched: 14 July 1967
- Commissioned: 1 March 1968
- Decommissioned: 14 November 1974
- Fate: Transferred to Papua New Guinea

Papua New Guinea
- Commissioned: 14 November 1974
- Decommissioned: 1987
- Fate: Used as parts hulk

General characteristics
- Class & type: Attack-class patrol boat
- Displacement: 100 tons standard; 146 tons full load
- Length: 107.6 ft (32.8 m) length overall
- Beam: 20 ft (6.1 m)
- Draught: 6.4 ft (2.0 m) at standard load; 7.3 ft (2.2 m) at full load
- Propulsion: 2 × 16-cylinder Paxman YJCM diesel engines; 3,460 shp (2,580 kW); 2 shafts
- Speed: 24 knots (44 km/h; 28 mph)
- Range: 1,200 nmi (2,200 km; 1,400 mi) at 13 knots (24 km/h; 15 mph)
- Complement: 3 officers, 16 sailors
- Armament: 1 × Bofors 40 mm gun; 2 × .50-calibre M2 Browning machine guns; Small arms

HMAS Samarai (P 85), named after the island of Samarai and its former town, was an Attack-class patrol boat of the Royal Australian Navy (RAN). Completed in 1968, the vessel was one of five assigned to the RAN's Papua New Guinea (PNG) Division. The patrol boat was transferred to the Papua New Guinea Defence Force in 1974 as HMPNGS Samarai. She remained in service until 1987, when she was paid off and used as a parts hulk.

== Design and construction ==
The Attack class was ordered in 1964 to operate in Australian waters as patrol boats (based on lessons learned through using the Ton-class minesweepers on patrols of Borneo during the Indonesia-Malaysia Confrontation, and to replace a variety of old patrol, search-and-rescue, and general-purpose craft. Initially, fourteen were ordered for the RAN, five of which were intended for the Papua New Guinea Division of the RAN, although another six ships were ordered to bring the class to twenty vessels.

The patrol boats had a displacement of 100 tons at standard load and 146 tons at full load, were 107.6 feet (32.8 m) in length overall, had a beam of 20 feet (6.1 m), and draughts of 6.4 feet (2.0 m) at standard load, and 7.3 feet (2.2 m) at full load. Propulsion machinery consisted of two 16-cylinder Paxman YJCM diesel engines, which supplied 3,460 shaft horsepower (2,580 kW) to the two propellers. The vessels could achieve a top speed of 24 knots (44 km/h; 28 mph), and had a range of 1,200 nautical miles (2,200 km; 1,400 mi) at 13 knots (24 km/h; 15 mph). The ship's company consisted of three officers and sixteen sailors. Main armament was a bow-mounted Bofors 40 mm gun, supplemented by two .50-calibre M2 Browning machine guns and various small arms. The ships were designed with as many commercial components as possible: the Attacks were to operate in remote regions of Australia and New Guinea, and a town's hardware store would be more accessible than home base in a mechanical emergency.

Samarai was built by Evans Deakin and Company at Brisbane, Queensland. Samarai was launched on 14 July 1967, and commissioned on 1 March 1968.

== Operational history ==
Samarai arrived in Port Moresby on 16 April 1968, before travelling with her sister ship Aitape for her home port at the RAN base HMAS Tarangau at Los Negros Island, Manus Province on 3 January 1968. Primary roles of the new patrol boats were fisheries protection and sea training, but also undertook search and rescue, medical evacuation and monitoring of navigational aids roles. The ship's company was made up of both Australian and PNG servicemen. Prior to the arrival of the Attack-class patrol boats, surveillance of PNG waters was conducted by small coastal craft and occasional visits by larger RAN warships, but the PNG Division was now able to chase and apprehend vessels suspected of illegal fishing.

Samarai was one of the five Attack-class patrol boats of the RAN PNG Division transferred to the Papua New Guinea Defence Force's (PNGDF) Maritime Element (now Maritime Operations Element) on 14 November 1974 when the PNGDF took over maritime functions from the RAN. They formed the PNGDF Patrol Boat Squadron based at Manus.

Samarai was paid off in 1987, and was used as a parts hulk.
