= Patrol Boat (TV series) =

- Genre: Action/Drama series
- Created by: James Davern
- Country of origin: Australia
- Original language: English
- No. of seasons: 2
- No. of episodes: 26

Production
- Running time: 55 minutes

Original release
- Network: ABC TV
- Release: 28 June 1979 – 11 August 1983

Patrol Boat is an Australian television action/drama series that screened on ABC Television and was created by James Davern, two series were produced, in 1979 and 1983, with a total of 26 episodes.

== Synopsis ==
Patrol Boat was about the activities of the crew of a Royal Australian Navy patrol boat which patrolled Australia's coastline. The series although fictional was produced with the co-operation of the Royal Australian Navy.

Two fictional RAN patrol boats were depicted in the series. Attack-class patrol boat HMAS Ambush (portrayed by HMA Ships Advance and Bombard) was used in the first season, with filming taking place during 1978 and 1979 around Sydney Harbour, Pittwater, Ku-ring-gai Chase, and the Hawkesbury River. For the second season, the crew transferred to the newer Fremantle-class patrol boat HMAS Defiance (portrayed by HMA Ships Launceston, Townsville, Warrnambool, Whyalla, and Wollongong).

The series is similar to the BBC series Warship, made with the co-operation of the Royal Navy and Royal Australian Navy and screened by the Australian Broadcasting Corporation from 1976. This was before Patrol Boat which was influenced by Warship. Although the 2007 drama Sea Patrol is based on the same subject, it is not intended to be a follow on to Patrol Boat.

Although ABC (Australian Broadcasting Corporation) originally screened both seasons of the TV series Patrol Boat, during 1992 Network Ten in Sydney replayed a select few episodes of the 1979 first season of the series weekly on Saturday nights at 7.30pm to capitalise on the nostalgia period that the network was trialling at the time.

== Cast ==
=== Main / regular ===
- Andrew McFarlane as Lieutenant David Keating
- Robert Coleby as Lieutenant Charles Fisher, called 'X' for executive officer
- Danny Adcock as Petty Officer 'Buffer' Johnston
- Tim Burns as Able Seaman 'Chef' McKinnon
- Robert Baxter as Petty Officer 'Swain' Reynolds
- Mervyn Drake as Petty Officer Peter Brown
- Grant Dodwell as Bluey
- Margo Lee as Matron Whylie
- Alan David Lee as Vince 'Walshy' Walsh
- Philip Parnell as Radio Operator 'Nobby' Clarke

=== Guests ===
- Angela Punch McGregor as Sue Halloran (2 episodes)
- Bob Baines as Canberra Captain (1 episode)
- Helen Hough (1 episode)
- Janet Andrewartha as uncredited (1 episode)
- Jon Blake as Mawson / Letich (2 episodes)
- Judy Morris (1 episode)
- Ken Blackburn as Commander Johns (1 episode)
- Kim Krejus as Judy (1 episode)
- Lulu Pinkus as Chris (1 episode)
- Lyn Collingwood as Swain's wife (1 episode)
- Maria Mercedes (1 episode)
- Mark Hembrow
- Mary Ann Severne as Mrs Lewis (1 episode)
- Nick Tate as Major Winn
- Noni Hazlehurst (1 episode)
- Penne Hackforth-Jones (1 episode)
- Penny Cook (1 episode)
- Philip Quast as Smith (1 episode)
- Tom Oliver as Inspector Forest (1 episode)
- Zoe Bertram (1 episode)

== Episode list ==
Season 1: 1979

1. "We Lie in Wait" 28 June 1979
2. "Rogue Mine" 5 July 1979
3. "Fish-Heads and Birdies" 19 July 1979
4. "Another Bunch of Reffos" 26 July 1979
5. "Follow the Leader" 2 August 1979
6. "My Dad's a Sailor" 9 August 1979
7. "Conduct Prejudicial" 16 August 1979
8. "Don't Call Me Borgia" 23 August 1979
9. "Incident at Mencken Bay" 30 August 1979
10. "Which Way's Mecca?" 6 September 1979
11. "The Enemy You Know" 13 September 1979
12. "Man Overboard" 20 September 1979
13. "Never Under the White Ensign" 27 September 1979

Season 2: 1983

1. "Something Old, Something New" 19 May 1983
2. "Tango Victor" 26 May 1983
3. "Nice Day For a Cruise" 2 June 1983
4. "Hands to Bathe" 9 June 1983
5. "Cold Turkey" 16 June 1983
6. "Spoils of War" 23 June 1983
7. "All the Nice Girls" 30 June 1983
8. "Make and Mend" 7 July 1983
9. "Operation Christmas" 14 July 1983
10. "The Albatross" 21 July 1983
11. "Par for the Course" 28 July 1983
12. "A Skunk on the Radar" 4 August 1983
13. "Beggarman Thief" 11 August 1983
