= HMAS Arrow =

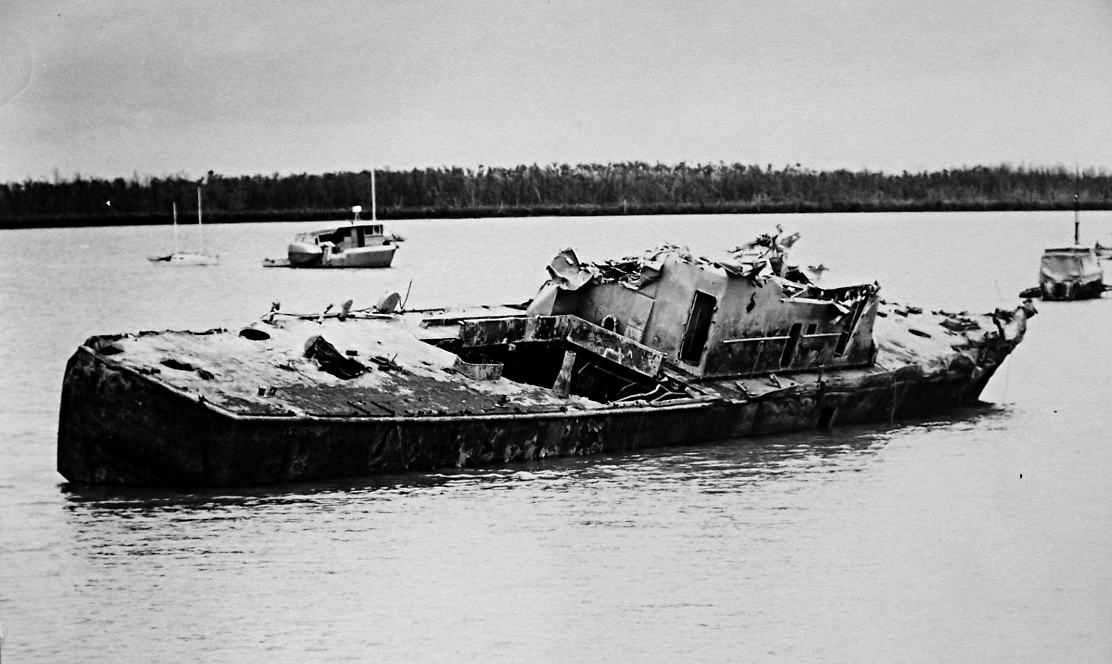
- HMAS Arrow beached in Frances Bay in early 1975

History

Australia
- Builder: Walkers Limited
- Launched: 17 February 1968
- Commissioned: 3 July 1968
- Motto: "Straight as an Arrow"
- Fate: Destroyed by Cyclone Tracy on 25 December 1974
- Badge

General characteristics
- Class & type: Attack-class patrol boat
- Displacement: 100 tons standard; 146 tons full load
- Length: 107.6 ft (32.8 m) length overall
- Beam: 20 ft (6.1 m)
- Draught: 6.4 ft (2.0 m) at standard load; 7.3 ft (2.2 m) at full load
- Propulsion: 2 × 16-cylinder Paxman YJCM diesel engines; 3,460 shp (2,580 kW); 2 shafts
- Speed: 24 knots (44 km/h; 28 mph)
- Range: 1,200 nmi (2,200 km; 1,400 mi) at 13 knots (24 km/h; 15 mph)
- Complement: 3 officers, 16 sailors
- Armament: 1 × Bofors 40 mm gun; 2 × .50-calibre M2 Browning machine guns; Small arms

HMAS Arrow (P 88) was an Attack-class patrol boat of the Royal Australian Navy (RAN). The patrol boat spent most of her career as a training vessel operating out of Port Melbourne, before being assigned for operational duties with the Third Australian Patrol Boat Squadron in Darwin during 1974. Arrow was wrecked in Darwin Harbour during Cyclone Tracy, in the early hours of Christmas morning the same year, with the loss of two of her crew.

== Design and construction ==
The Attack class was ordered in 1964 to operate in Australian waters as patrol boats (based on lessons learned through using the Ton-class minesweepers on patrols of Borneo during the Indonesia–Malaysia confrontation), and to replace a variety of old patrol, search-and-rescue, and general-purpose craft. Initially, nine were ordered for the RAN, with another five for Papua New Guinea's Australian-run coastal security force, although another six ships were ordered to bring the class to twenty vessels. The patrol boats had a displacement of 100 tons at standard load and 146 tons at full load, were 107.6 feet (32.8 m) in length overall, had a beam of 20 feet (6.1 m), and draughts of 6.4 feet (2.0 m) at standard load, and 7.3 feet (2.2 m) at full load. Propulsion machinery consisted of two 16-cylinder Paxman YJCM diesel engines, which supplied 3,460 shaft horsepower (2,580 kW) to the two propellers. The vessels could achieve a top speed of 24 knots (44 km/h; 28 mph), and had a range of 1,200 nautical miles (2,200 km; 1,400 mi) at 13 knots (24 km/h; 15 mph). The ship's company consisted of three officers and sixteen sailors. The main armament was a bow-mounted Bofors 40 mm gun, supplemented by two .50-calibre M2 Browning machine guns and various small arms. The ships were designed with as many commercial components as possible: the Attacks were to operate in remote regions of Australia and New Guinea, and a town's hardware store would be more accessible than home base in a mechanical emergency.

Arrow was built by Walkers Limited at Maryborough, Queensland, launched on 17 February 1968, and commissioned on 3 July 1968.

== Operational history ==
After commissioning Arrow was transferred to the Melbourne Division of the Royal Australian Naval Reserve on 16 July 1968. She operated out of HMAS Lonsdale in a training capacity. The patrol boat returned to Sydney for refit in 1974 and was recommissioned into active service on 31 July, assigned to the Third Australian Patrol Boat Squadron in Darwin.

After arriving in Darwin on 2 September, Arrow completed a hydrographic survey of Collier Bay in Western Australia, before commencing fisheries surveillance patrols in late October.

== Cyclone Tracy ==
On 24 December 1974, Arrow along with sister ships Assail, Advance and Attack were alongside in Darwin. Crews were recalled from leave due to the impending Cyclone Tracy and the ships ordered to ride out the storm at cyclone moorings in the harbour. Arrow reached the mooring buoy around 1830 that evening. Conditions deteriorated through the night, and Arrow broke free of her mooring at around 0245 on 25 December when her anchor winch was ripped from the deck by the extreme weather conditions. Her Commanding Officer, Lieutenant Bob Dagworthy ordered her engines started and attempted to hold position. However as both engines soon began to overheat and with her navigation equipment destroyed, Dagworthy decided to run the ship aground on mudflats in Frances Bay. Struggling to control the ship on one remaining engine, Arrow struck and sank at Stokes Hill Wharf in Darwin with the loss of two sailors: Petty Officer Leslie Catton and Able Seaman Ian Rennie.

== Aftermath ==
On 16 September 1977, Able Seaman Robert McLeod was awarded the Australian Bravery Medal for assisting his injured shipmates.

== Memorial ==
On 24 April 2019, a memorial, to HMAS Arrow and the sailors that lost their lives, was unveiled at the Royal Flying Doctor Service and The Bombing of Darwin Tourist Facility at Stokes Hill Wharf by two surviving crew members and family of the two sailors that died.

== See also ==
- Booya (ship)
