= HMAS Madang (P 94) =

Australian, then PNG, naval vessel

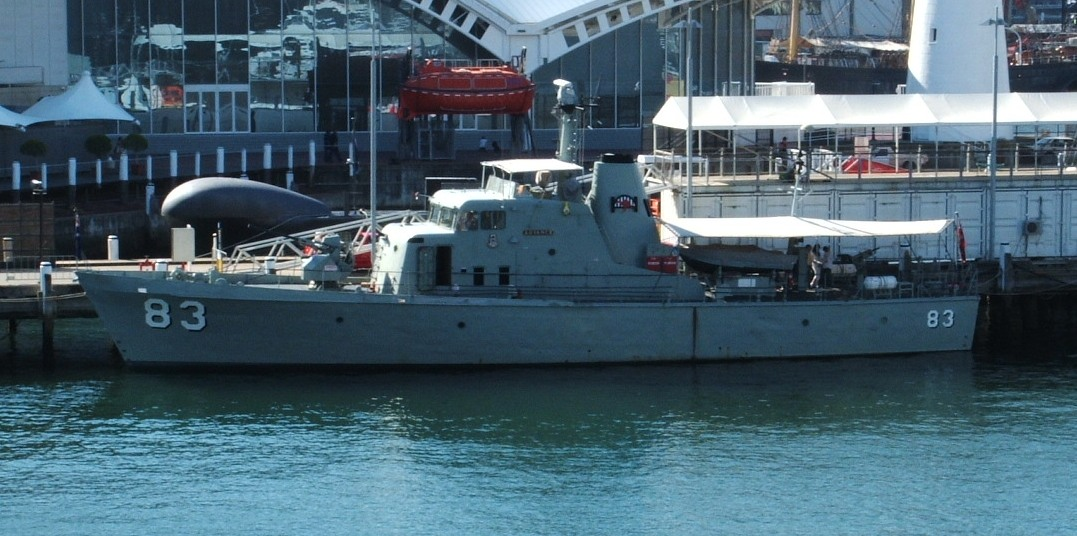
- HMAS Advance, a sister ship to Madang

History

Australia
- Namesake: Settlement of Madang, New Guinea
- Builder: Evans Deakin and Company
- Launched: 10 October 1968
- Commissioned: 28 November 1968
- Decommissioned: 14 November 1974
- Motto: "Our Ship Your Shield"
- Fate: Transferred to Papua New Guinea
- Badge

Papua New Guinea
- Commissioned: 14 November 1974
- Decommissioned: 1989
- Fate: Unknown

General characteristics
- Class & type: Attack-class patrol boat
- Displacement: 100 tons standard; 146 tons full load
- Length: 107.6 ft (32.8 m) length overall
- Beam: 20 ft (6.1 m)
- Draught: 6.4 ft (2.0 m) at standard load; 7.3 ft (2.2 m) at full load
- Propulsion: 2 × 16-cylinder Paxman YJCM diesel engines; 3,460 shp (2,580 kW); 2 shafts
- Speed: 24 knots (44 km/h; 28 mph)
- Range: 1,200 nmi (2,200 km; 1,400 mi) at 13 knots (24 km/h; 15 mph)
- Complement: 3 officers, 16 sailors
- Armament: 1 × Bofors 40 mm gun; 2 × .50-calibre M2 Browning machine guns; Small arms

HMAS Madang (P 94), named for the settlement of Madang in New Guinea, was an Attack-class patrol boat of the Royal Australian Navy (RAN). Completed in 1968, the vessel was one of five assigned to the RAN's Papua New Guinea (PNG) Division. The patrol boat was transferred to the Papua New Guinea Defence Force in 1974 as HMPNGS Madang. She was decommissioned in 1989.

== Design and construction ==
The Attack class was ordered in 1964 to operate in Australian waters as patrol boats (based on lessons learned through using the Ton-class minesweepers on patrols of Borneo during the Indonesia-Malaysia Confrontation), and to replace a variety of old patrol, search-and-rescue, and general-purpose craft. Initially, fourteen were ordered for the RAN, five of which were intended for the Papua New Guinea Division of the RAN, although another six ships were ordered to bring the class to twenty vessels.

The patrol boats had a displacement of 100 tons at standard load and 146 tons at full load, were 107.6 feet (32.8 m) in length overall, had a beam of 20 feet (6.1 m), and draughts of 6.4 feet (2.0 m) at standard load, and 7.3 feet (2.2 m) at full load. Propulsion machinery consisted of two 16-cylinder Paxman YJCM diesel engines, which supplied 3,460 shaft horsepower (2,580 kW) to the two propellers. The vessels could achieve a top speed of 24 knots (44 km/h; 28 mph), and had a range of 1,200 nautical miles (2,200 km; 1,400 mi) at 13 knots (24 km/h; 15 mph). The ship's company consisted of three officers and sixteen sailors. Main armament was a bow-mounted Bofors 40 mm gun, supplemented by two .50-calibre M2 Browning machine guns and various small arms. The ships were designed with as many commercial components as possible: the Attacks were to operate in remote regions of Australia and New Guinea, and a town's hardware store would be more accessible than home base in a mechanical emergency.

Madang was built by Evans Deakin at Brisbane, Queensland, launched on 10 August 1968, and commissioned on 28 November 1968.

== Operational history ==
Madang arrived in Port Moresby in March 1969, the last of the five Attack-class boats to be delivered to the PNG Division. Her home port was the RAN base HMAS Tarangau at Los Negros Island, Manus Province. Primary roles of the new patrol boats were fisheries protection and sea training, but also undertook search and rescue, medical evacuation and monitoring of navigational aids roles. The ship's company was made up of both Australian and PNG servicemen. Prior to the arrival of the Attack-class patrol boats, surveillance of PNG waters was conducted by small coastal craft and occasional visits by larger RAN warships, but the PNG Division was now able to chase and apprehend vessels suspected of illegal fishing.

Madang was one of the five Attack-class patrol boats of the PNG Division transferred to the Papua New Guinea Defence Force's (PNGDF) Maritime Element (now Maritime Operations Element) on 14 November 1974 when the PNGDF took over maritime functions. They formed the PNGDF Patrol Boat Squadron based at Manus. Madang was decommissioned in 1989.
