= HMAS Archer =

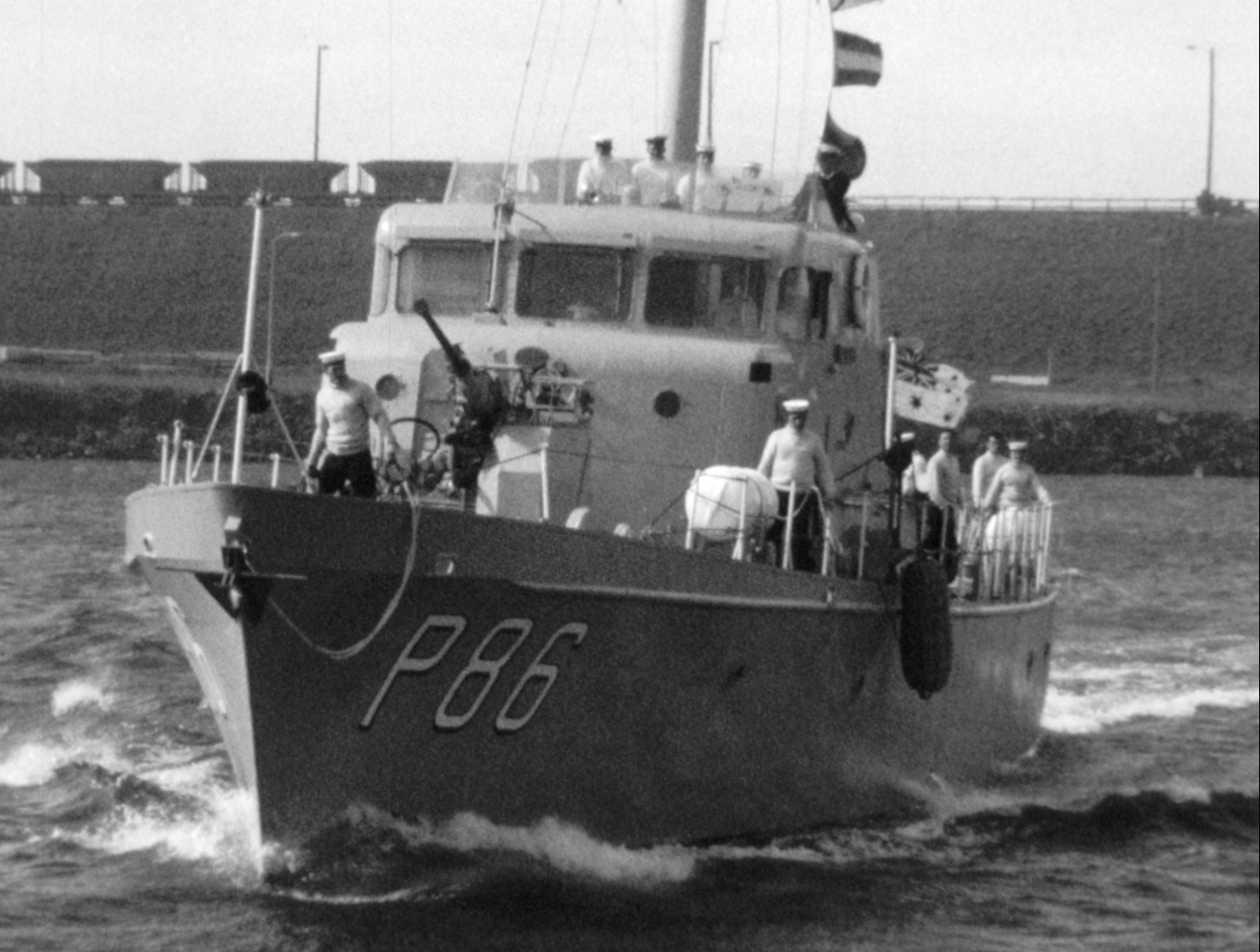
- HMAS Archer enters Port Kembla Harbour in August 1968

History

Australia
- Builder: Evans Deakin and Company
- Launched: 2 December 1967
- Commissioned: 15 May 1968
- Decommissioned: 21 May 1974
- Identification: Pennant number: P 86
- Fate: Sold to Indonesia

Indonesia
- Name: Siliman
- Identification: Pennant number: 848
- Fate: Sank due to engine fire, 28 September 2025

General characteristics
- Class & type: Attack-class patrol boat
- Displacement: 100 tons standard; 146 tons full load
- Length: 107.6 ft (32.8 m) length overall
- Beam: 20 ft (6.1 m)
- Draught: 6.4 ft (2.0 m) at standard load; 7.3 ft (2.2 m) at full load
- Propulsion: 2 × 16-cylinder Paxman YJCM diesel engines; 3,460 shp (2,580 kW); 2 shafts
- Speed: 24 knots (44 km/h; 28 mph)
- Range: 1,200 nautical miles (2,200 km; 1,400 mi) at 13 knots (24 km/h; 15 mph)
- Complement: 3 officers, 16 sailors
- Armament: 1 × Bofors 40 mm L/60 QF Mark VII gun; 2 × .50-calibre M2 Browning machine guns; Small arms

HMAS Archer (P 86) was an Attack-class patrol boat of the Royal Australian Navy (RAN). Later it entered service with the Indonesian Navy as KRI Siliman (848).

== Design and construction ==
The Attack class was ordered in 1964 to operate in Australian waters as patrol boats, replacing a variety of old patrol, search-and-rescue, and general-purpose craft. The design was developed based on lessons learned from the use of Ton-class minesweepers for patrol duties off Borneo during the Indonesia-Malaysia Confrontation. Initially, nine boats were ordered for the RAN, with another five for Papua New Guinea's Australian-run coastal security force. Subsequently, another six ships were ordered which brought the class to 20 vessels. The class had a displacement of 100 tons at standard load and 146 tons at full load, were 107.6 feet (32.8 m) in length overall, had a beam of 20 feet (6.1 m), and draughts of 6.4 feet (2.0 m) at standard load, and 7.3 feet (2.2 m) at full load. Propulsion machinery consisted of two 16-cylinder Paxman YJCM diesel engines, which supplied 3,460 shaft horsepower (2,580 kW) to the two propellers. The vessels could achieve a top speed of 24 knots (44 km/h; 28 mph), and had a range of 1,200 nautical miles (2,200 km; 1,400 mi) at 13 knots (24 km/h; 15 mph). The ship's company consisted of three officers and sixteen sailors. Main armament was a bow-mounted Bofors 40 mm gun, supplemented by two .50-calibre M2 Browning machine guns and various small arms. The ships were designed with as many commercial components as possible: the class were to operate in remote regions of Australia and New Guinea, and needed to be able to utilise locally available mechanical components.

Archer was built by Walkers Limited at Maryborough, Queensland, launched on 2 December 1967 and commissioned on 15 May 1968.

== Operational history ==
Archer paid off on 21 October 1974. She was transferred to the Indonesian Navy and renamed KRI Siliman, and was listed in Jane's Fighting Ships as still operational in 2011.

According to reports by Janes, Siliman sank due to engine fire while moored off the Port of Belawan, North Sumatra on the night of 28 September 2025. All 21 crew members were rescued.
