= Soviet destroyer Smely =

Smely (Cyrillic: Смелый, alternative spelling Smelyi) has been the name of more than one destroyer of the Soviet Navy:

- Soviet destroyer Smely (1939), a Storozhevoy-class destroyer commissioned on 31 May 1941 and sunk on 27 July 1941
- Soviet destroyer Smely (1949), a Skory-class destroyer commissioned on 21 December 1949 and sunk as a target in November 1960
- Soviet destroyer Smely (1968), a Kashin-class destroyer commissioned on 27 December 1969 and decommissioned on 9 January 1988, which then served in the Polish Navy as ORP Warszawa (1988) from 1988 to 29 August 2005
