= HMAS Ladava =

Papua New Guinea Defence Force vessel

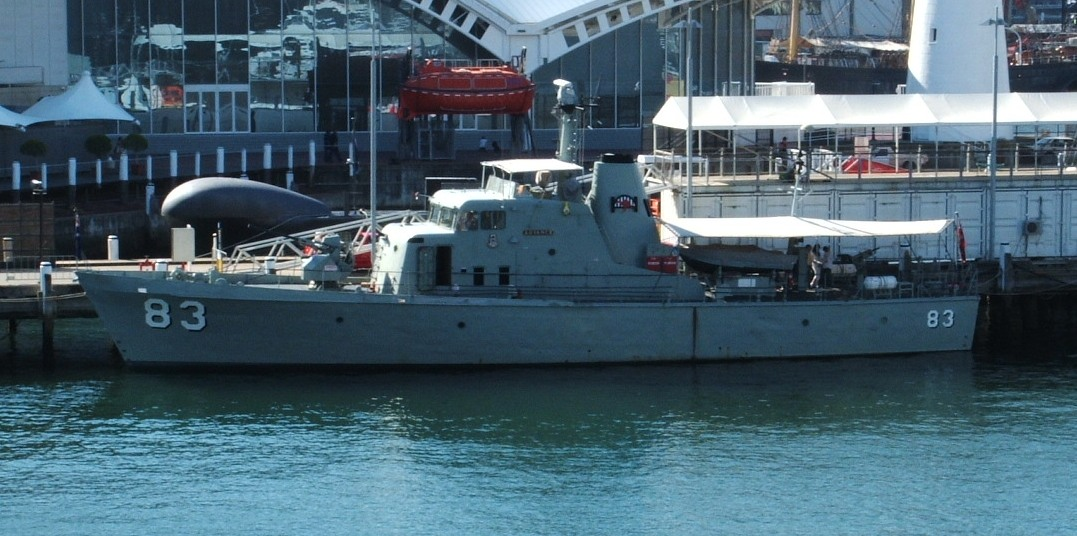
- HMAS Advance, a sister ship to Ladava

History

Australia
- Namesake: Village of Ladava, PNG
- Builder: Walkers Limited
- Launched: 11 May 1968
- Commissioned: 21 October 1968
- Decommissioned: 14 November 1974
- Motto: "Fight The Good Fight"
- Fate: Transferred to Papua New Guinea
- Badge

Papua New Guinea
- Commissioned: 14 November 1974
- Decommissioned: 1988
- Fate: Unknown

General characteristics
- Class & type: Attack-class patrol boat
- Displacement: 100 tons standard; 146 tons full load
- Length: 107.6 ft (32.8 m) length overall
- Beam: 20 ft (6.1 m)
- Draught: 6.4 ft (2.0 m) at standard load; 7.3 ft (2.2 m) at full load
- Propulsion: 2 × 16-cylinder Paxman YJCM diesel engines; 3,460 shp (2,580 kW); 2 shafts
- Speed: 24 knots (44 km/h; 28 mph)
- Range: 1,200 nmi (2,200 km; 1,400 mi) at 13 knots (24 km/h; 15 mph)
- Complement: 3 officers, 16 sailors
- Armament: 1 × Bofors 40 mm gun; 2 × .50-calibre M2 Browning machine guns; Small arms

HMAS Ladava (P 92) was an Attack-class patrol boat of the Royal Australian Navy (RAN). It was named after the small village of Ladava situated on the shore of Milne Bay in Alotau District, Papua New Guinea. Completed in 1968, the vessel was one of five assigned to the RAN's Papua New Guinea (PNG) Division. The patrol boat was transferred to the Papua New Guinea Defence Force in 1974 as HMPNGS Ladava. The patrol boat was decommissioned in 1988, although her fate is unknown.

== Design and construction ==
The Attack class was ordered in 1964 to operate in Australian waters as patrol boats (based on lessons learned through using the Ton-class minesweepers on patrols of Borneo during the Indonesia-Malaysia Confrontation, and to replace a variety of old patrol, search-and-rescue, and general-purpose craft. Initially, fourteen were ordered for the RAN, five of which were intended for the Papua New Guinea Division of the RAN, although another six ships were ordered to bring the class to twenty vessels.

The patrol boats had a displacement of 100 tons at standard load and 146 tons at full load, were 107.6 feet (32.8 m) in length overall, had a beam of 20 feet (6.1 m), and draughts of 6.4 feet (2.0 m) at standard load, and 7.3 feet (2.2 m) at full load. Propulsion machinery consisted of two 16-cylinder Paxman YJCM diesel engines, which supplied 3,460 shaft horsepower (2,580 kW) to the two propellers. The vessels could achieve a top speed of 24 knots (44 km/h; 28 mph), and had a range of 1,200 nautical miles (2,200 km; 1,400 mi) at 13 knots (24 km/h; 15 mph). The ship's company consisted of three officers and sixteen sailors. Main armament was a bow-mounted Bofors 40 mm gun, supplemented by two .50-calibre M2 Browning machine guns and various small arms. The ships were designed with as many commercial components as possible: the Attacks were to operate in remote regions of Australia and New Guinea, and a town's hardware store would be more accessible than home base in a mechanical emergency.

Ladava was built by Walkers Limited at Maryborough, Queensland, launched on 11 May 1968, and commissioned on 21 October 1968.

== Operational history ==
HMAS Ladava arrived at the RAN base HMAS Tarangau at Los Negros Island, Manus Province in December 1968, joining the previously delivered Aitape, Samarai, and Lae. Primary roles of the new patrol boats were fisheries protection and sea training, but also undertook search and rescue, medical evacuation and monitoring of navigational aids roles. The ship's company was made up of both Australian and PNG servicemen. Prior to the arrival of the Attack-class patrol boats, surveillance of PNG waters was conducted by small coastal craft and occasional visits by larger RAN warships, but the PNG Division was now able to chase and apprehend vessels suspected of illegal fishing.

In February 1968, Ladava and sister ship Aitape traveled 231 miles (372 km) up the Sepik River in western Papua New Guinea. In a first for the PNG Division, HMAS Ladava became the first patrol boat to be completely PNG-crewed on 18 June 1974, when Lieutenant Karry Frank took command.

Ladava was one of the five Attack-class patrol boats of the RAN PNG Division transferred to the Papua New Guinea Defence Force's (PNGDF) Maritime Element (now Maritime Operations Element) on 14 November 1974 when the PNGDF took over maritime functions from the RAN. They formed the PNGDF Patrol Boat Squadron based at Manus. Ladava was decommissioned in 1988.
