= HMAS Acute =

1967 Attack-class patrol vessel

History

Australia
- Builder: Evans Deakin and Company
- Laid down: April 1967
- Launched: 26 August 1967
- Commissioned: 26 April 1968
- Decommissioned: 6 May 1983
- Motto: Swift to the Point
- Nickname(s): "The Lone Gun of the West Coast"
- Fate: Sold to Indonesia
- Badge

Indonesia
- Name: Silea
- Status: Active as of 2011

General characteristics
- Class & type: Attack-class patrol boat
- Displacement: 100 tons standard; 146 tons full load
- Length: 107.6 ft (32.8 m) length overall
- Beam: 20 ft (6.1 m)
- Draught: 6.4 ft (2.0 m) at standard load; 7.3 ft (2.2 m) at full load
- Propulsion: 2 × 16-cylinder Paxman YJCM diesel engines; 3,460 shp (2,580 kW); 2 shafts
- Speed: 24 knots (44 km/h; 28 mph)
- Range: 1,200 nmi (2,200 km; 1,400 mi) at 13 knots (24 km/h; 15 mph)
- Complement: 3 officers, 16 sailors
- Armament: 1 × Bofors 40 mm L/60 QF Mark VII gun; 2 × .50-calibre M2 Browning machine guns; Small arms

HMAS Acute (P 81) was an Attack-class patrol boat operated by the Royal Australian Navy (RAN).

== Design and construction ==
The Attack class was ordered in 1964 to operate in Australian waters as patrol boats (based on lessons learned through using the Ton-class minesweepers on patrols of Borneo during the Indonesia-Malaysia Confrontation, and to replace a variety of old patrol, search-and-rescue, and general-purpose craft. Initially, nine were ordered for the RAN, with another five for Papua New Guinea's Australian-run coastal security force, although another six ships were ordered to bring the class to twenty vessels. The patrol boats had a displacement of 100 tons at standard load and 146 tons at full load, were 107.6 feet (32.8 m) in length overall, had a beam of 20 feet (6.1 m), and draughts of 6.4 feet (2.0 m) at standard load, and 7.3 feet (2.2 m) at full load. Propulsion machinery consisted of two 16-cylinder Paxman YJCM diesel engines, which supplied 3,460 shaft horsepower (2,580 kW) to the two propellers. The vessels could achieve a top speed of 24 knots (44 km/h; 28 mph), and had a range of 1,200 nautical miles (2,200 km; 1,400 mi) at 13 knots (24 km/h; 15 mph). The ship's company consisted of three officers and sixteen sailors. Main armament was a bow-mounted Bofors 40 mm gun, supplemented by two .50-calibre M2 Browning machine guns and various small arms. The ships were designed with as many commercial components as possible: the Attacks were to operate in remote regions of Australia and New Guinea, and a town's hardware store would be more accessible than home base in a mechanical emergency.

Acute was laid down by Evans Deakin and Company at Brisbane, launched on 26 August 1967, and commissioned on 26 April 1968.

== Operational history ==
Acute was predominantly used for training of Royal Australian Navy Reserve personnel at Fremantle, Western Australia. From November 1978 until the 1980s, Acute was attached to the Permanent Naval Force, and was assigned to the newly completed base at HMAS Stirling. Before the Two Ocean Policy was completely implemented, the patrol boat was for several years the only warship assigned to Western Australia (with the nickname "The Lone Gun of the West Coast"), and responsible for patrolling an area extending from Albany to Broome. Whilst on a training cruise in May 1983, Acute apprehended two Taiwanese fishing boats engaged in illegal fishing. This was the first such operation involving RANR personnel.

Acute paid off on 6 May 1983. She was transferred to the Indonesian Navy and renamed Silea. The patrol boat was listed in Jane's Fighting Ships as still operational in 2011.
