= HMAS Bandolier =

Patrol boat of the Royal Australian Navy

History

Australia
- Builder: Walkers Limited
- Launched: 2 October 1968
- Commissioned: 14 December 1968
- Decommissioned: 16 November 1973
- Motto: "Dressed To Kill"
- Fate: Sold to Indonesian Navy
- Badge

Indonesia
- Name: Sibarau
- Fate: Sank in December 2017

General characteristics
- Class & type: Attack-class patrol boat
- Displacement: 100 tons standard; 146 tons full load
- Length: 107.6 ft (32.8 m) oa
- Beam: 20 ft (6.1 m)
- Draught: 6.4 ft (2.0 m) at standard load; 7.3 ft (2.2 m) at full load
- Propulsion: 2 × 16-cylinder Paxman YJCM diesel engines; 3,460 shp (2,580 kW); 2 shafts
- Speed: 24 knots (44 km/h; 28 mph)
- Range: 1,200 nautical miles (2,200 km; 1,400 mi) at 13 knots (24 km/h; 15 mph)
- Complement: 3 officers, 16 sailors
- Armament: 1 × Bofors 40 mm gun; 2 × .50 calibre M2 Browning machine guns; Small arms

HMAS Bandolier (P 95) was an Attack-class patrol boat of the Royal Australian Navy (RAN).

== Design and construction ==
The Attack class was ordered in 1964 to operate in Australian waters as patrol boats (based on lessons learned through using the Ton-class minesweepers on patrols of Borneo during the Indonesia-Malaysia Confrontation, and to replace a variety of old patrol, search-and-rescue, and general-purpose craft. Initially, nine ships were ordered for the RAN, with another five for Papua New Guinea's Australian-run coastal security force, although another six ships were ordered to bring the class to twenty vessels. The patrol boats had a displacement of 100 tons at standard load and 146 tons at full load, were 107.6 feet (32.8 m) in length overall, had a beam of 20 feet (6.1 m), and draughts of 6.4 feet (2.0 m) at standard load and 7.3 feet (2.2 m) at full load. Propulsion machinery consisted of two 16-cylinder Paxman YJCM diesel engines, which supplied 3,460 shaft horsepower (2,580 kW) to the two propellers. The vessels could achieve a top speed of 24 knots (44 km/h; 28 mph), and had a range of 1,200 nautical miles (2,200 km; 1,400 mi) at 13 knots (24 km/h; 15 mph). The ship's company consisted of three officers and sixteen sailors.The main armament was a bow-mounted Bofors 40 mm gun, supplemented by two .50 calibre M2 Browning machine guns and various small arms. The ships were designed with as many commercial components as possible: the attacks were to operate in remote regions of Australia and New Guinea, and a town's hardware store would be more accessible than home base in a mechanical emergency.

Bandolier was built by Walkers Limited at Maryborough, Queensland, launched on 2 October 1968, and commissioned on 14 December 1968.

== Operational history ==
Bandolier paid off on 16 November 1973. She was transferred to the Indonesian Navy and renamed KRI Sibarau (847). The patrol boat listed in Jane's Fighting Ships was still operational in 2011. In December 2017, the vessel sank while on patrol in the North Sumatra Sea at 03.45.38 North and 098.57.55 East. The cause was not known, but there were no casualties among the crew.
