= Walkers Limited =

Australian locomotive manufacturer

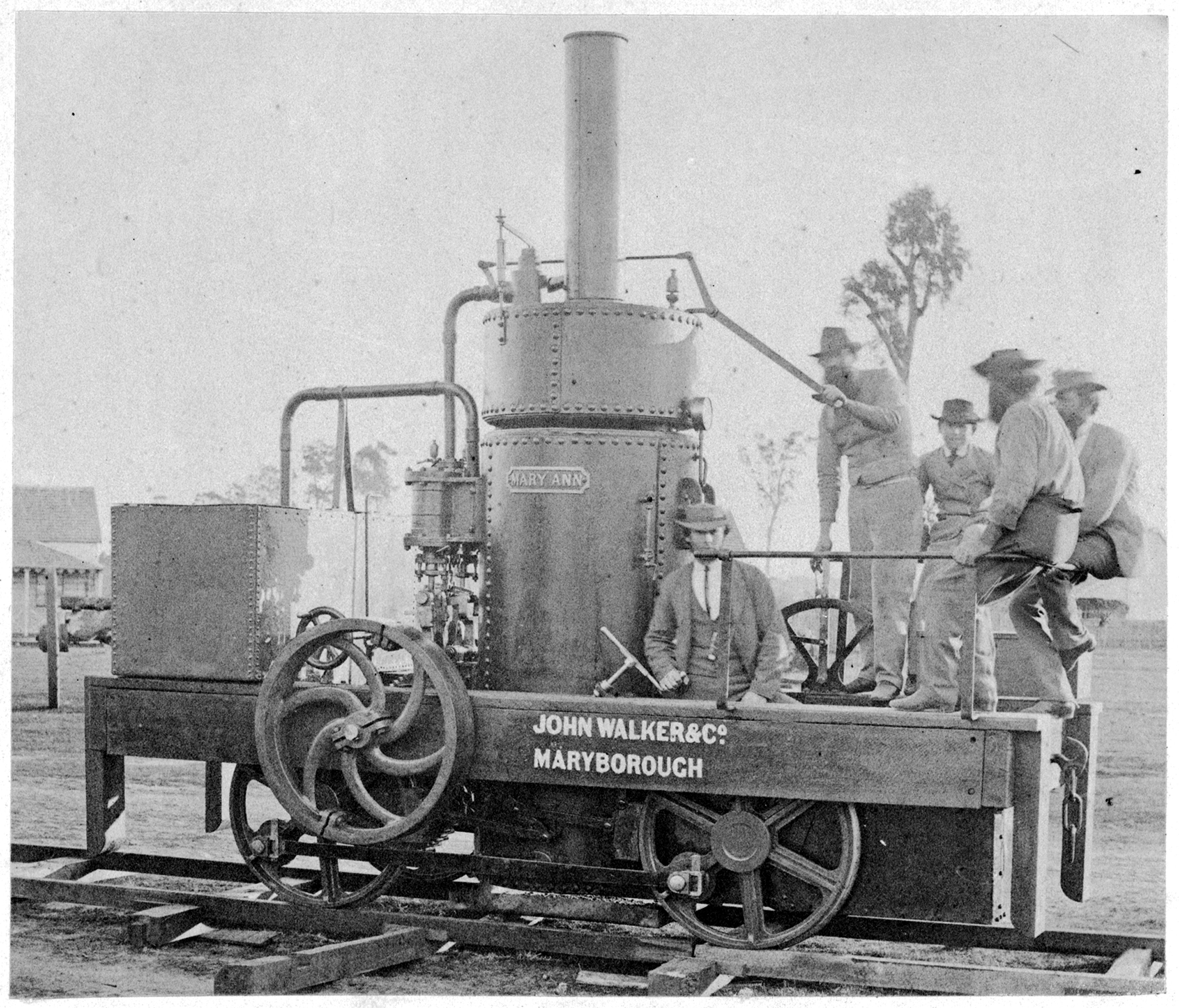
- Queensland’s first steam locomotive, c.1873
- Industry: Engineering
- Founded: 1863
- Founder: John Walker
- Defunct: 12 January 2020
- Fate: Acquired by Downer Rail
- Successor: Downer Rail
- Headquarters: Maryborough; 25.5439°S 152.7067°E
- Products: Railway locomotives Railway rolling stock Ships
- Parent: Evans Deakin Industries

Walkers Limited was an Australian engineering and shipbuilding company based in Maryborough, Queensland. It built large vessels and railway locomotives. The Walkers factory still produces locomotives and rolling stock as part of Downer Rail.

== History ==
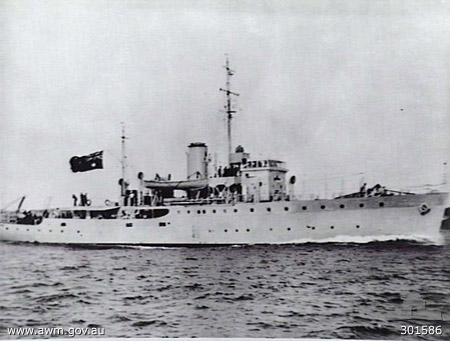
HMAS Toowoomba in 1941

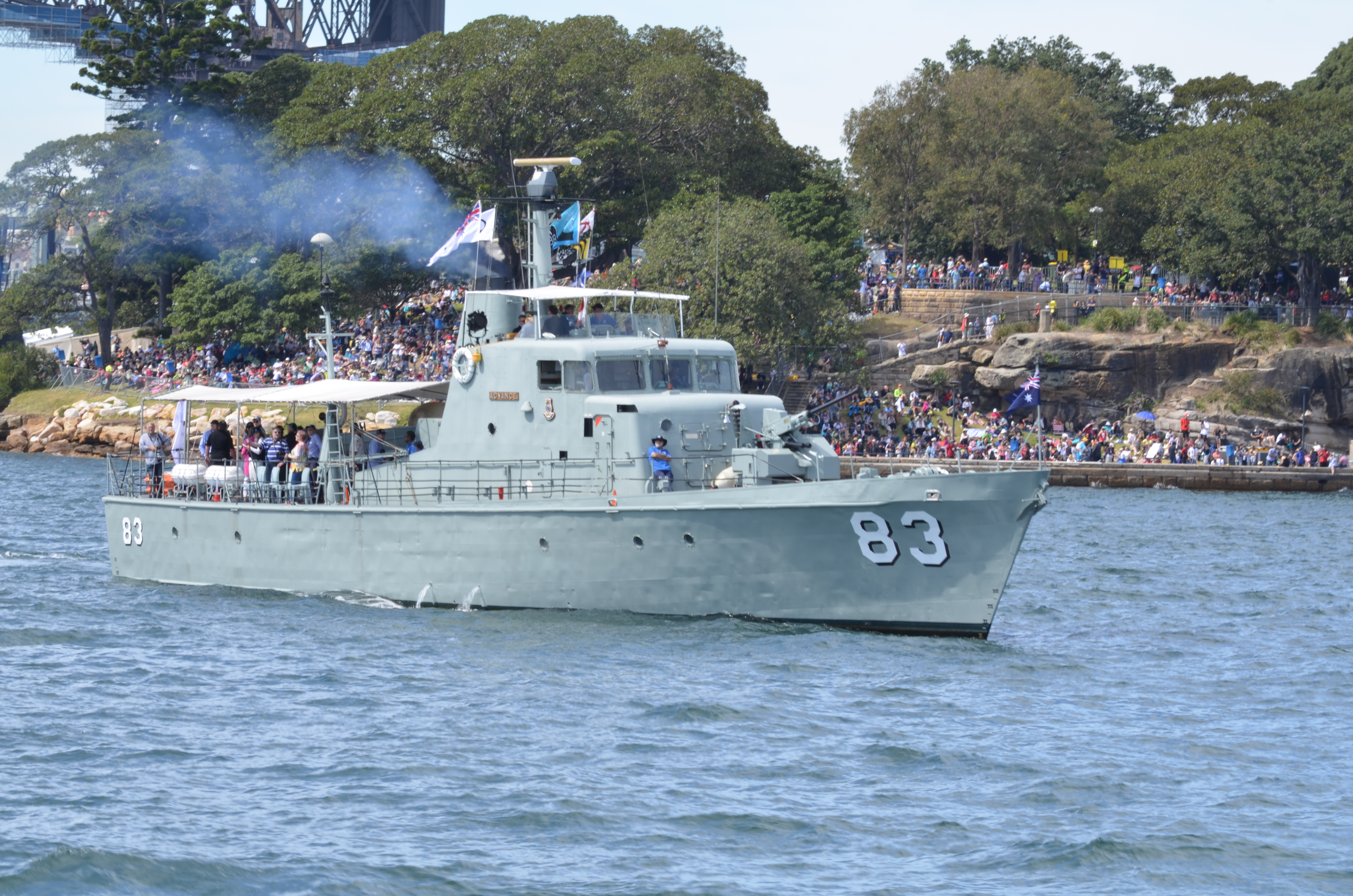
Former Royal Australian Navy Attack-class patrol boat HMAS Advance on Port Jackson in October 2013

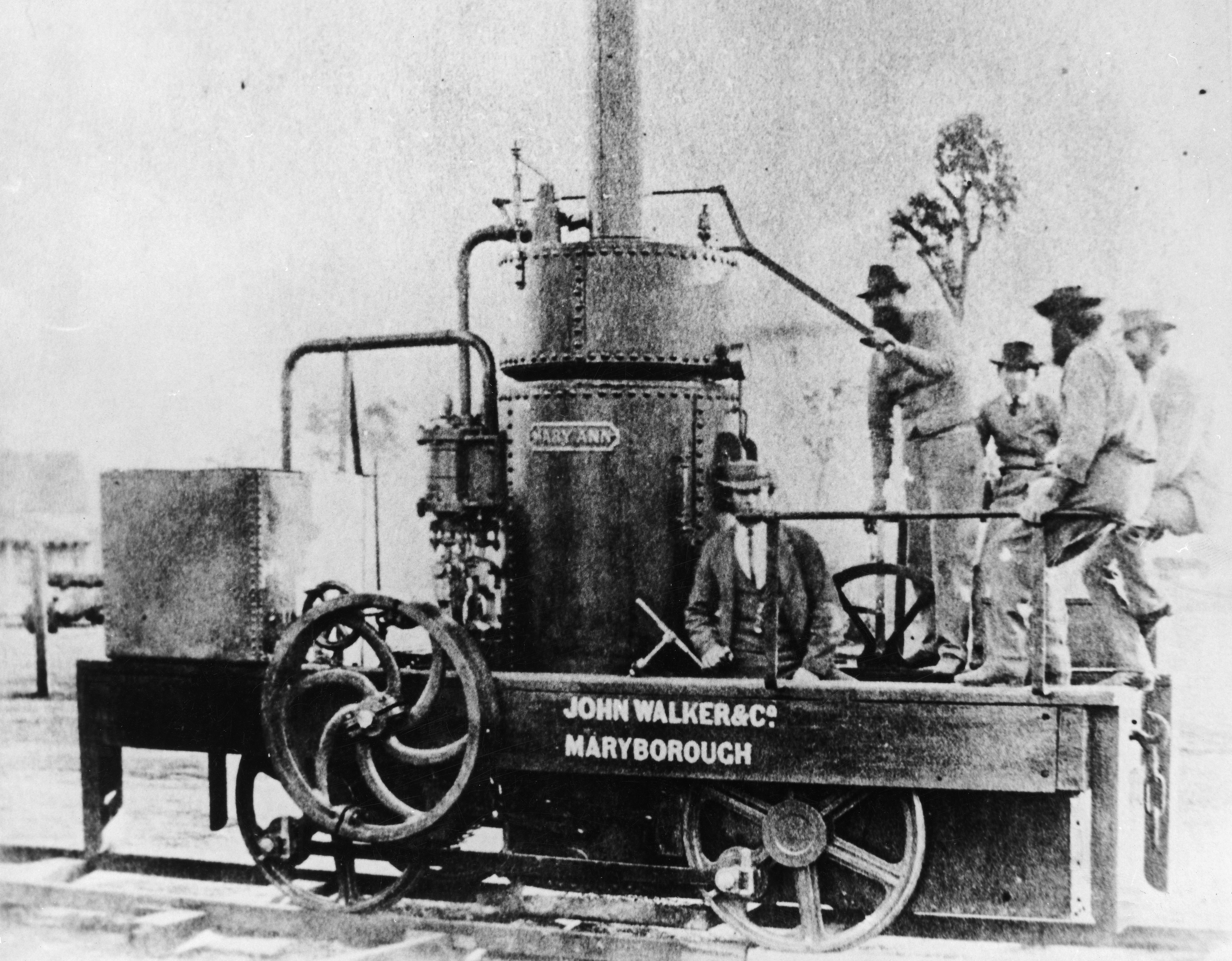
"Mary Ann", the first steam locomotive built in Queensland, built by John Walker & Co, circa 1875

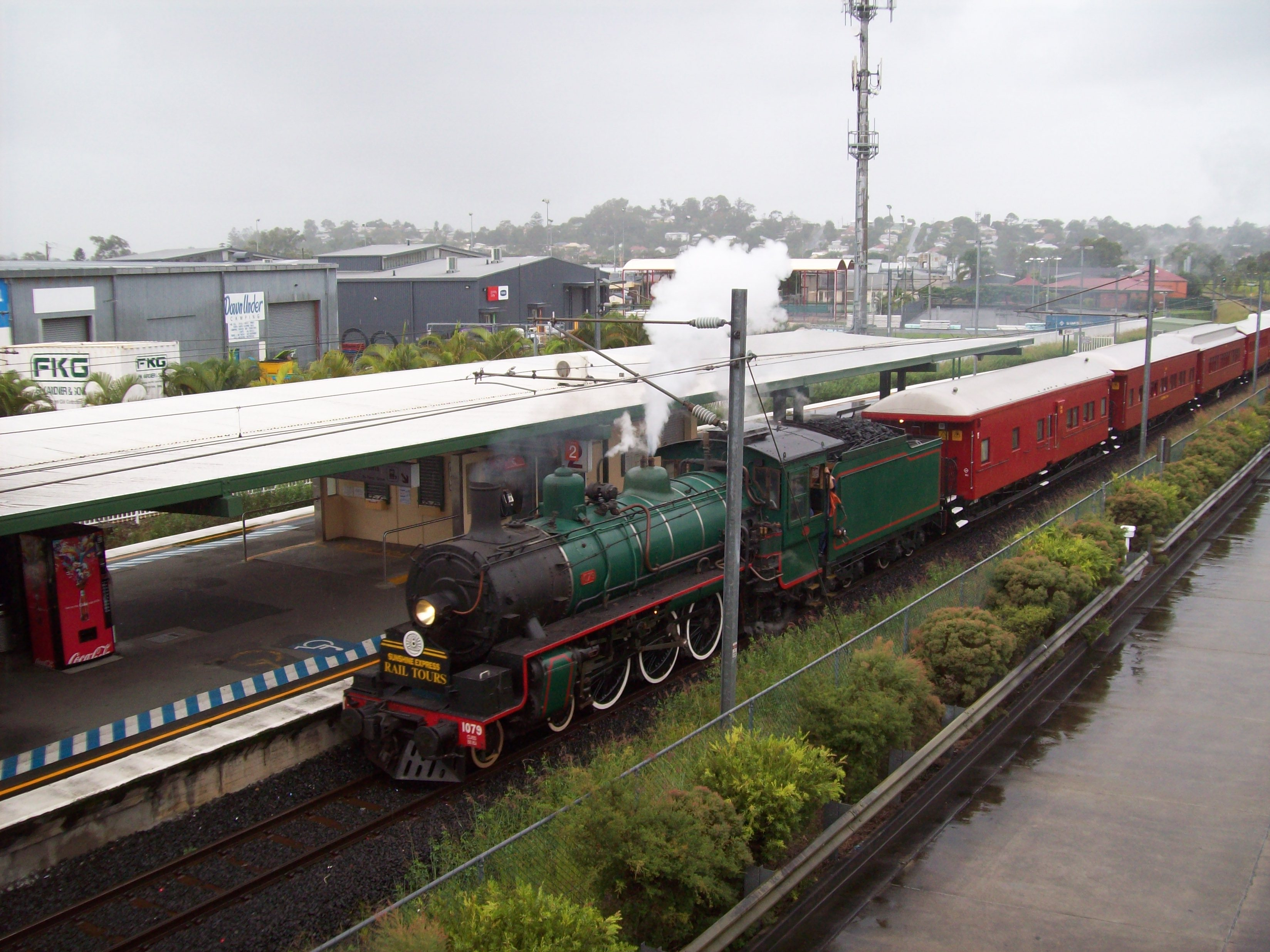
Preserved Queensland BB18¼ class at Enoggera in April 2009

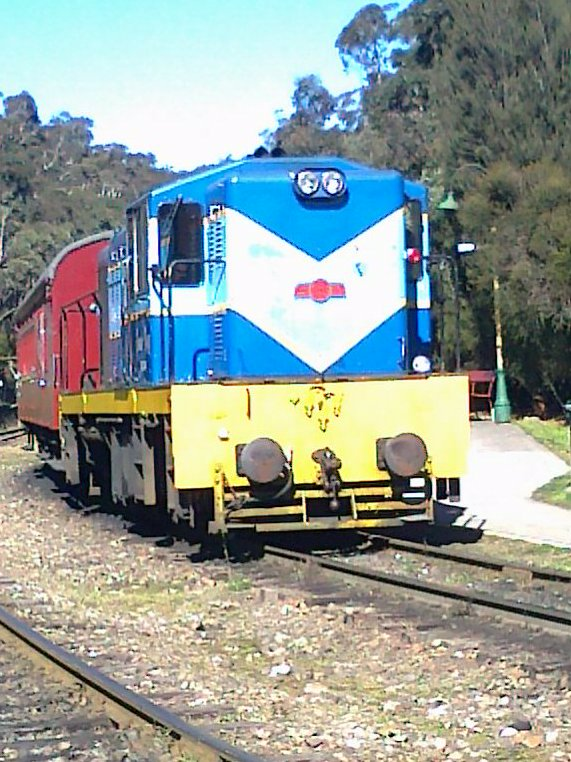
Preserved Emu Bay Railway 10 class on the Zig Zag Railway in July 2011

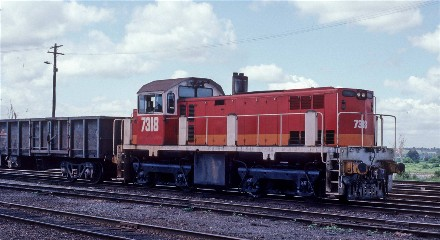
State Rail Authority 73 class at Grafton station in January 1986

In 1863 John Walker and three friends set up the Union Foundry of John Walker & Co in Ballarat. In 1867 a branch was opened in Maryborough.

The Ballarat assets were disposed of in 1879 and in 1884, the business became a limited company under the title John Walker & Co Limited, being renamed Walkers Limited in 1888. The company produced most of the parts for machinery at sugar mills.

In 1980 Walkers Limited was sold to Evans Deakin Industries. It was included in the purchase of Evans Deakin by Downer Group in March 2001 and today the Maryborough factory continues to operate as part of Downer Rail.

In 2003 Bundaberg Foundry Engineers completed the acquisition of the Walkers Sugar Business and moved to change the operating name to Bundaberg Walkers Engineering in January 2008.

== Ships ==
In 1884, the firm began work on five hopper barges for the Queensland Department of Harbours & Rivers. During construction the decision was taken to convert them to also serve as auxiliary gunboats, which made them the largest warships built in Australia before federation. During World War II, Walkers constructed two River-class frigates, a Bay-class frigate and seven Bathurst-class corvettes, in addition to other smaller vessels. Post war naval contracts included seven Attack-class patrol boats in the late 1960s and eight Balikpapan-class landing craft heavy in the early 1970s. After the completion of the latter, Walker's Maryborough shipyard closed in 1974.

=== Royal Australian Navy ships ===
- 1 Bay-class frigate: HMAS Shoalhaven
- 2 River-class frigates: HMAS Burdekin and Diamantina
- 7 Bathurst-class corvettes: HMAS Bowen, Cairns, Gladstone, Maryborough, Rockhampton, Tamworth and Toowoomba
- 7 Attack-class patrol boats: HMAS Advance, Aitape, Arrow, Bandolier, Barbette, Ladava and Lae
- 8 Balikpapan-class landing craft heavy: HMAS Balikpapan, Brunei, Labuan, Tarakan, Wewak, Salamaua, Buna and Betano
- 9 Koala-class boom defence vessel: HMAS Kimbla
- 2 Explorer class general-purpose vessels: HMAS Bass, HMAS Banks

== Trains ==
The company's first locomotive was built at Maryborough in 1873 for William Pettigrew's (now heritage-listed) Cooloola Tramway; it was called "Mary Ann" as it was the name of the daughter of William Pettigrew and also the name of the daughter of his business partner William Sim. The first major contract for locomotives came in 1896, when an order for thirty B15 class steam locomotives was placed by Queensland Railways. In the 1960s Walkers offered a diesel-hydraulic unit to Queensland's sugar operators. Although not successful, it did sell six to BHP, Whyalla from 1962. It had more success with its DH class shunter with over 130 built for Queensland Rail, the New South Wales Government Railways, Emu Bay Railway and Western Australian Government Railways.

=== Steam locomotives ===
- 46 Queensland B class
- 122 Queensland PB15 class
- 45 Queensland C16 class
- 138 Queensland C17 class
- 6 Queensland C19 class
- 59 Queensland B18¼ class
- 20 Queensland BB18¼ class
- 20 Victorian D^{D} class
- 20 Commonwealth Railways KA class
- 8 Commonwealth Railways C class
- 40 South Australian T class
- 3 Tasmanian Government Railways Q class

=== Diesel electric locomotives ===
- 12 Queensland 1170 class

=== Diesel hydraulic locomotives ===
- 6 BHP Whyalla DH class
- 3 Emu Bay Railway 10 class
- 73 Queensland Railways DH class
- 50 New South Wales 73 class
- 7 Emu Bay Railway 11 class
- 5 Western Australian Government Railways M class

=== Electric locomotives ===
- 50 Queensland Rail 3500/3600 class
- 30 Queensland Rail 3900 class

=== Electric multiple units ===
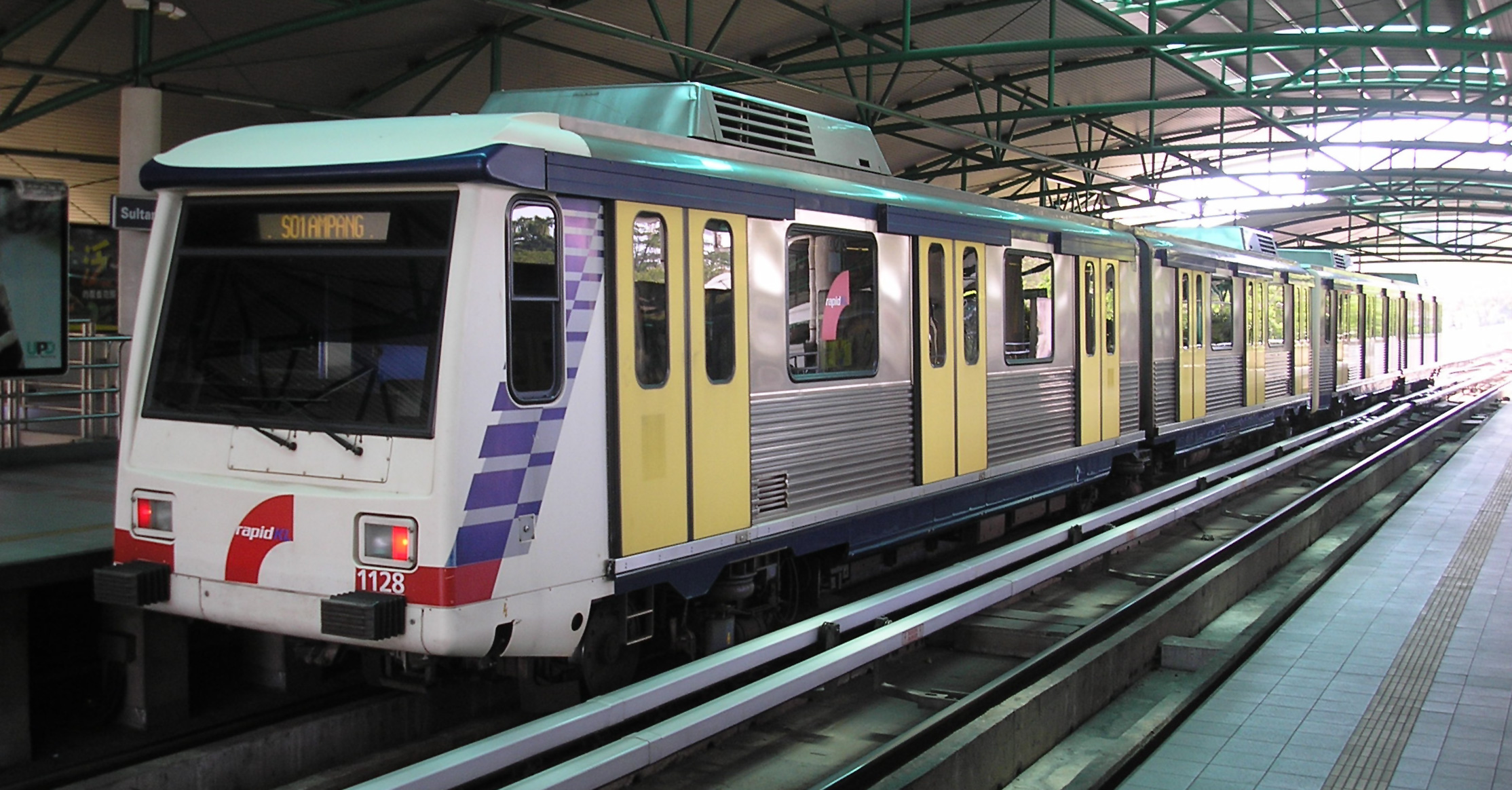
A former Kuala Lumpur Metro rolling stock of Adtranz-Walkers EMU

- 264 Queensland Rail EMU carriages
- 36 Queensland Rail SMU200 carriages
- 90 Queensland Rail SMU220 carriages
- 20 Queensland Rail ICE carriages
- 30 Queensland Rail IMU100 carriages
- 12 Queensland Rail IMU120 carriages
- 96 Transperth A series carriages
- 90 Kuala Lumpur Metro Line 3 & 4 light rail vehicles

=== Tilt Trains ===
- 12 Queensland Rail Tilt Train carriages

== Awards ==
In 2017, Walkers Limited was inducted into the Queensland Business Leaders Hall of Fame. Walkers Limited is regarded as being one of Queensland's greatest companies spanning 150 years in the engineering manufacturing sector.
