= Attack-class patrol boat =

Royal Australian Navy craft, 1967–1991

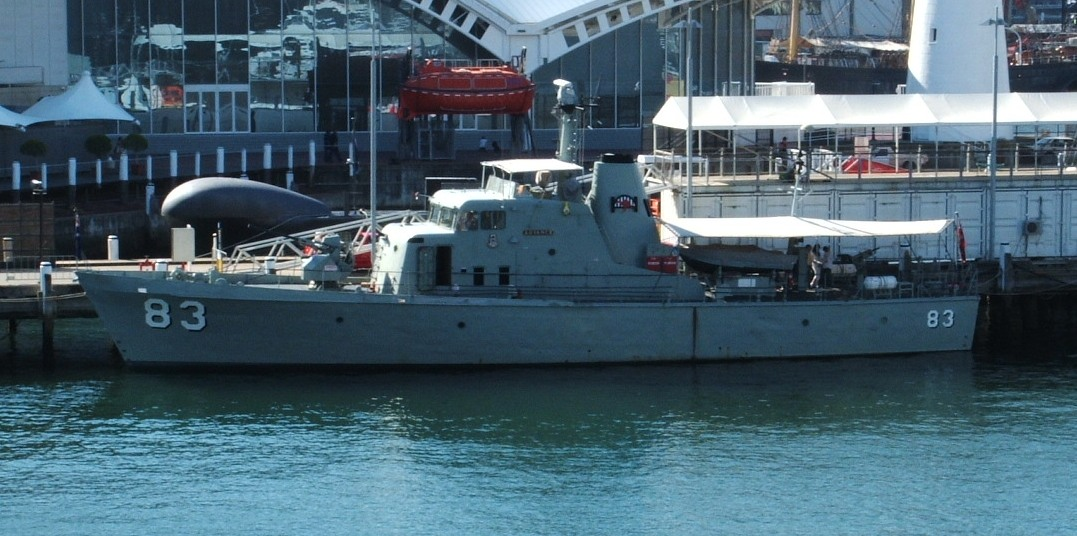
- HMAS Advance, now a museum ship at the Australian National Maritime Museum

Class overview
- Name: Attack class
- Builders: Evans Deakin and Company; Walkers Limited
- Operators: Royal Australian Navy; Indonesian Navy; Papua New Guinea Maritime Element
- Preceded by: Bathurst-class corvette
- Succeeded by: Fremantle class
- Cost: A$800,000
- Completed: 20
- Lost: 1
- Retired: 9
- Preserved: 2

General characteristics
- Type: Patrol boat
- Displacement: 100 tons standard; 146 tons full load
- Length: 107.5 ft (32.8 m)
- Beam: 20 ft (6.1 m)
- Draught: 7.3 ft (2.2 m) at full load
- Propulsion: 2 × 16-cylinder Paxman YJCM diesel engines; 2 shafts
- Speed: 24 knots (44 km/h; 28 mph)
- Range: 1,200 nmi (2,200 km; 1,400 mi) at 13 knots (24 km/h; 15 mph)
- Complement: 3 officers, 16 sailors
- Armament: 1 × 40 mm Bofors gun; 2 × .50 calibre machine guns
- Notes: Taken from:

The Attack-class patrol boats were small coastal defence vessels built for the Royal Australian Navy (RAN) and operated between 1967 and at least 1991. Following their Australian service, twelve ships were transferred to Papua New Guinea and Indonesia.

== Construction ==
Twenty boats were ordered by the Department of Defence in November 1965 at a cost of around A$800,000 each from two Queensland shipyards, Evans Deakin in Brisbane and Walkers in Maryborough. Five were marked for the formation of a "New Guinea coastal security force", while the other fifteen were for patrols and general duties in Australian waters.

The first vessel was scheduled to be commissioned in August 1966, but she was not launched until March 1967.

The inclusion of the Attack class in the RAN fleet led to a smaller scaled down version of the ship's badge design to be created, as it was not deemed appropriate for such small vessels to use the full-size crest. The crest used by the patrol boats and other minor war vessels is scaled down from 755 by 620 millimetres (29.7 by 24.4 in) to 440 by 365 millimetres (17.3 by 14.4 in), with no other alterations to the design.

== Operational history and fates ==
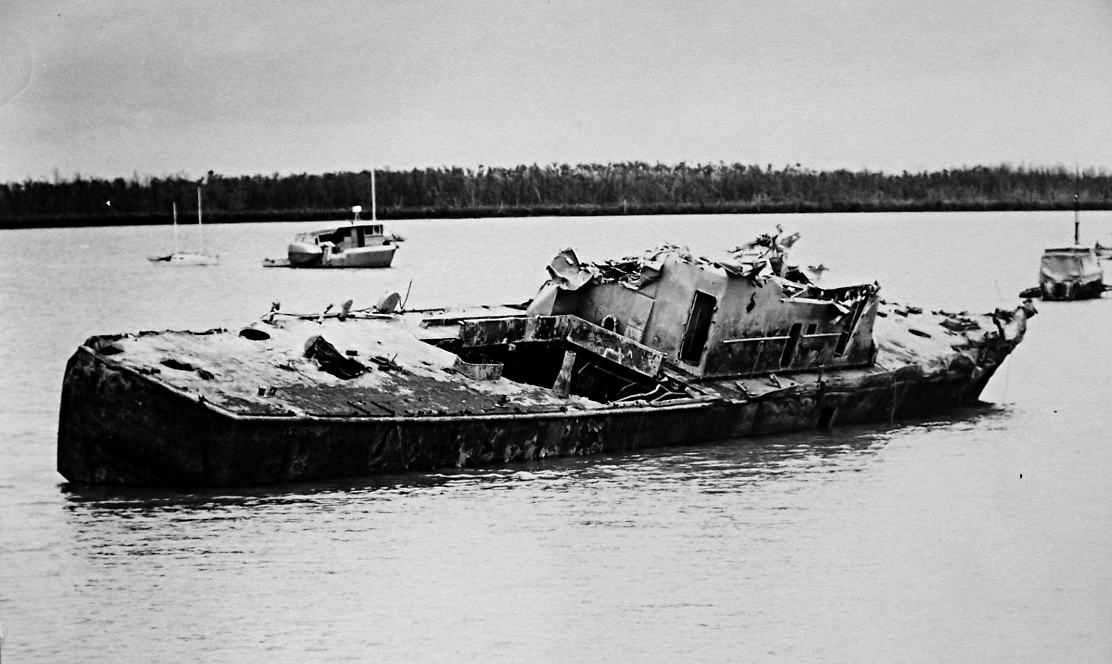
Arrow beached in 1975

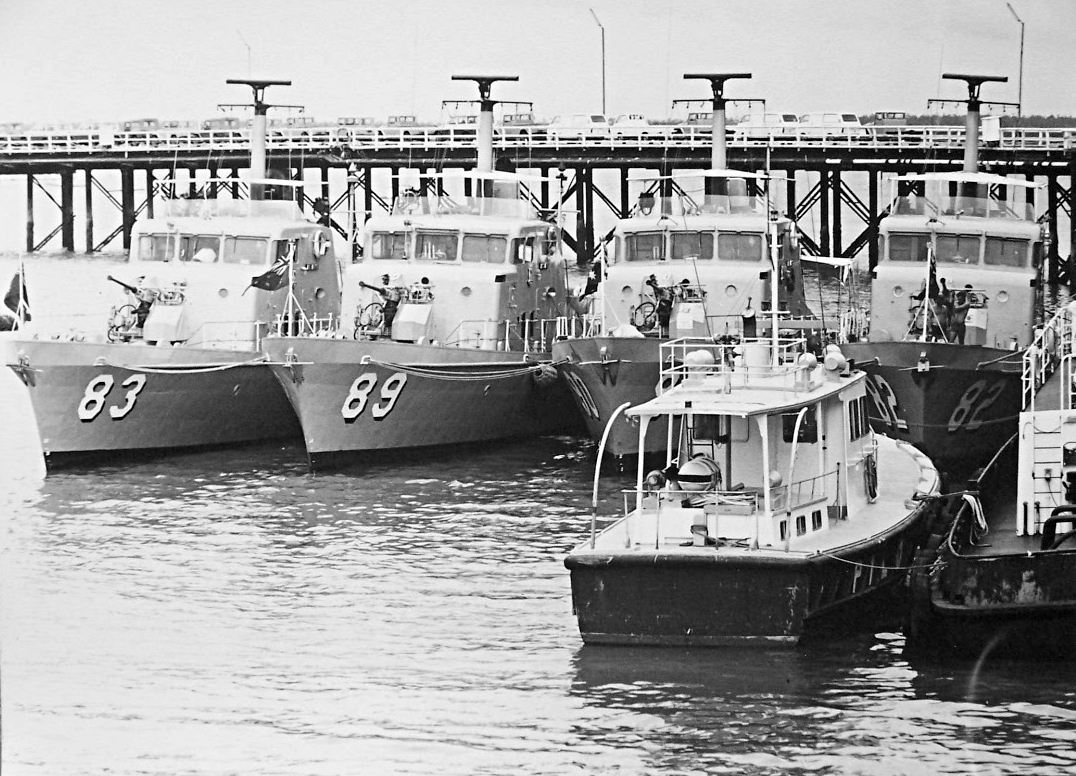
Attack-class boats at Stokes Hill Wharf, Darwin March 1975 (after Cyclone Tracy) From left to right is P83 Advance P89 Assail P90 Attack and P82 Adriot

The Attack class was replaced in RAN service by the larger and more capable Fremantle-class patrol boats.

In 1975, Aitape, Ladava, Lae, Madang, and Samarai were transferred to the Papua New Guinea Defence Force. All five were paid off during the late 1980s, with Aitape sunk as a dive wreck off Port Moresby in 1995.

Acute, Archer, Assail, Attack, Barbette, Bandolier, Barricade, and Bombard were transferred to the Indonesian Navy between 1974 and 1985, and are listed in Jane's Fighting Ships as still operational in 2011.

Arrow was destroyed in Darwin on 25 December 1974 during Cyclone Tracy.

Advance was donated to the Australian National Maritime Museum in the late 1980s for preservation as a museum ship. Ardent was to be preserved as a memorial in Darwin, but was instead sold into civilian service in 2001 and converted into a pleasure craft. Aware was sold to a private owner during the 1990s, who modified her for use as a diving and salvage mothership, then was resold in to new owners in 2006. Bayonet was scuttled in Bass Strait in 1999 and has been successfully dived. Adroit paid off on 28 March 1992 and was sunk as a target by A-4 Skyhawk aircraft of the Royal New Zealand Air Force west of Rottnest Island on 8 August 1994. The remainder of the class were broken up for scrap.

=== In fiction ===
Two Attack-class boats represented the fictional HMAS Ambush in the first series of the Australian Broadcasting Corporation TV series Patrol Boat.

== List of ships ==
Royal Australian Navy
Ship	Pennant	Builder	Launched	Commissioned	Decommissioned	Fate
Acute	P 81	Evans Deakin and Company	26 August 1967	26 April 1968	6 May 1983	Transferred to Indonesia (KRI Silea 858)
Adroit	P 82	Evans Deakin and Company	3 February 1968	17 August 1968	28 March 1992	Sunk as target, 8 August 1994
Advance	P 83	Walkers Limited	16 August 1967	24 January 1968	6 February 1988	Museum ship ANMM, Sydney
Archer	P 86	Evans Deakin and Company	2 December 1967	15 May 1968	21 May 1974	Transferred to Indonesia (KRI Siliman 848)
Ardent	P 87	Evans Deakin and Company	27 April 1968	26 October 1968	6 January 1994	Decommissioned to a navigation training vessel (pennant number A243), paid off December 1998. Sold into civilian service as MV Ardent, purchased by Indonesia in 2002 (KRI Tenggiri 865)
Arrow	P 88	Walkers Limited	17 February 1968	3 July 1968		Destroyed at Darwin by Cyclone Tracy on 25 December 1974.
Assail	P 89	Evans Deakin and Company	18 November 1967	21 July 1968	18 October 1985	Transferred to Indonesia (KRI Sigurot 864)
Attack	P 90	Evans Deakin and Company	17 November 1967	8 April 1967	21 February 1985	Transferred to Indonesia (KRI Sikuda 863
Aware	P 91	Evans Deakin and Company	7 October 1967	21 June 1968	17 July 1993	Sold into private ownership, Bundaberg, Queensland. Scrapped 2011.
Bandolier	P 95	Walkers Limited	2 October 1968	14 December 1968	16 November 1973	Transferred to Indonesia (KRI Sibarau 847)
Barbette	P 97	Walkers Limited	10 April 1968	16 August 1968	15 June 1984	Transferred to Indonesia (KRI Siada 862)
Barricade	P 98	Evans Deakin and Company	29 June 1968	26 October 1968	20 May 1982	Transferred to Indonesia (KRI Sigalu 857)
Bayonet	P 101	Evans Deakin and Company	6 November 1968	22 February 1969	26 June 1988	Scuttled 21 September 1999, Victoria
Bombard	P 99	Evans Deakin and Company	6 July 1968	5 November 1968	12 September 1983	Transferred to Indonesia (KRI Siribua 859)
Buccaneer	P 100	Evans Deakin and Company	14 September 1968	11 November 1969	27 July 1984	Sunk as target, 8 October 1988

Royal Australian Navy – Papua New Guinea Division
Ship	Pennant	Builder	Launched	Commissioned	Decommissioned	Fate
Aitape	P 84	Walkers Limited	6 July 1967	13 November 1967	14 November 1974	Transferred to Papua New Guinea, (HMPNGS Aitape). Scuttled 1995
Ladava	P 92	Walkers Limited	11 May 1968	13 November 1967	14 November 1974	Transferred to Papua New Guinea, (HMPNGS Ladava)
Lae	P 93	Walkers Limited	5 October 1967	3 April 1968	14 November 1974	Transferred to Papua New Guinea, (HMPNGS Lae)
Madang	P 94	Evans Deakin and Company	10 October 1968	28 November 1968	14 November 1974	Transferred to Papua New Guinea, (HMPNGS Madang)
Samarai	P 85	Evans Deakin and Company	14 July 1967	1 March 1968	14 November 1974	Transferred to Papua New Guinea, (HMPNGS Samarai)

The 1998 edition of Jane's Fighting Ships reports that two vessels of a similar design, pennant numbers 860 and 861 (KRI Waigeo), were being operated by the Indonesian Navy. It speculates that these were locally built copies of the class.
