= HMAS Assail =

Patrol boat of the Royal Australian Navy

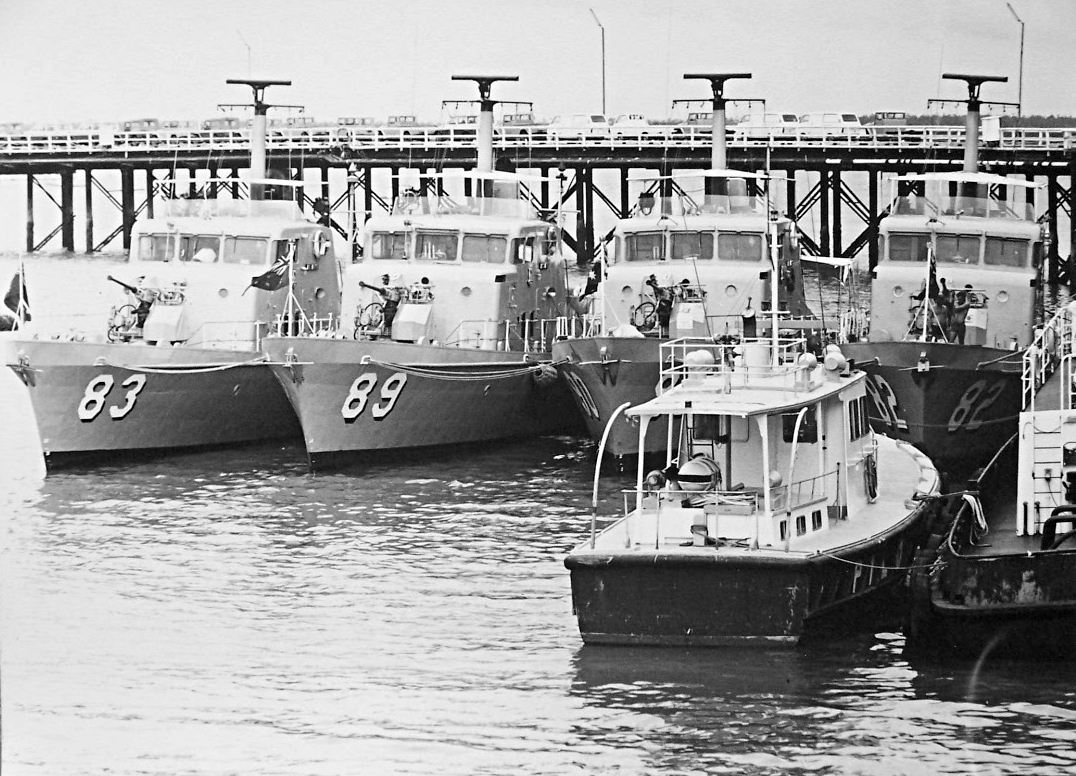
- HMAS Assail (Second from left) with three other Attack-class patrol boats

History

Australia
- Builder: Evans Deakin and Company
- Launched: 18 November 1967
- Commissioned: 21 July 1968
- Decommissioned: 18 October 1985
- Motto: "Cut Deep"
- Fate: Sold to Indonesian Navy
- Badge

Indonesia
- Name: Sigurot
- Status: Active as of 2011

General characteristics
- Class & type: Attack-class patrol boat
- Displacement: 100 tons standard; 146 tons full load
- Length: 107.6 ft (32.8 m) length overall
- Beam: 20 ft (6.1 m)
- Draught: 6.4 ft (2.0 m) at standard load; 7.3 ft (2.2 m) at full load
- Propulsion: 2 × 16-cylinder Paxman YJCM diesel engines; 3,460 shp (2,580 kW); 2 shafts
- Speed: 24 knots (44 km/h; 28 mph)
- Range: 1,200 nmi (2,200 km; 1,400 mi) at 13 knots (24 km/h; 15 mph)
- Complement: 3 officers, 16 sailors
- Armament: 1 × Bofors 40 mm L/60 QF Mark VII gun; 2 × .50-calibre M2 Browning machine guns; Small arms

HMAS Assail (P 89) was an Attack-class patrol boat of the Royal Australian Navy (RAN).

== Design and construction ==
The Attack class was ordered in 1964 to operate in Australian waters as patrol boats (based on lessons learned through using the Ton-class minesweepers on patrols of Borneo during the Indonesia-Malaysia Confrontation, and to replace a variety of old patrol, search-and-rescue, and general-purpose craft. Initially, nine were ordered for the RAN, with another five for Papua New Guinea's Australian-run coastal security force, although another six ships were ordered to bring the class to twenty vessels. The patrol boats had a displacement of 100 tons at standard load and 146 tons at full load, were 107.6 feet (32.8 m) in length overall, had a beam of 20 feet (6.1 m), and draughts of 6.4 feet (2.0 m) at standard load, and 7.3 feet (2.2 m) at full load. Propulsion machinery consisted of two 16-cylinder Paxman YJCM diesel engines, which supplied 3,460 shaft horsepower (2,580 kW) to the two propellers. The vessels could achieve a top speed of 24 knots (44 km/h; 28 mph), and had a range of 1,200 nautical miles (2,200 km; 1,400 mi) at 13 knots (24 km/h; 15 mph). The ship's company consisted of three officers and sixteen sailors. Main armament was a bow-mounted Bofors 40 mm gun, supplemented by two .50-calibre M2 Browning machine guns and various small arms. The ships were designed with as many commercial components as possible: the Attacks were to operate in remote regions of Australia and New Guinea, and a town's hardware store would be more accessible than home base in a mechanical emergency.

Assail was built by Evans Deakin and Company at Brisbane, Queensland, launched on 18 November 1967, and commissioned on 12 July 1968.

== Operational history ==
The patrol boat was in Darwin Harbour when Cyclone Tracy struck in the early hours of 25 December 1974. As conditions deteriorated, the cable attaching Assail to the cyclone mooring snapped. While riding out the storm, it was reported that the ship reached 80 degrees of roll, her side navigation lights observed to be immersed in the water. Assail was able to exit the harbour safely.

Assail paid off on 18 October 1985, and was transferred to the Indonesian Navy and renamed KRI Sigurot (864). The patrol boat was listed in Jane's Fighting Ships as still operational in 2011.
