= HMAS Advance =

1968 Attack-class patrol boat

Coordinates: 33°52.15′S 151°11.995′E

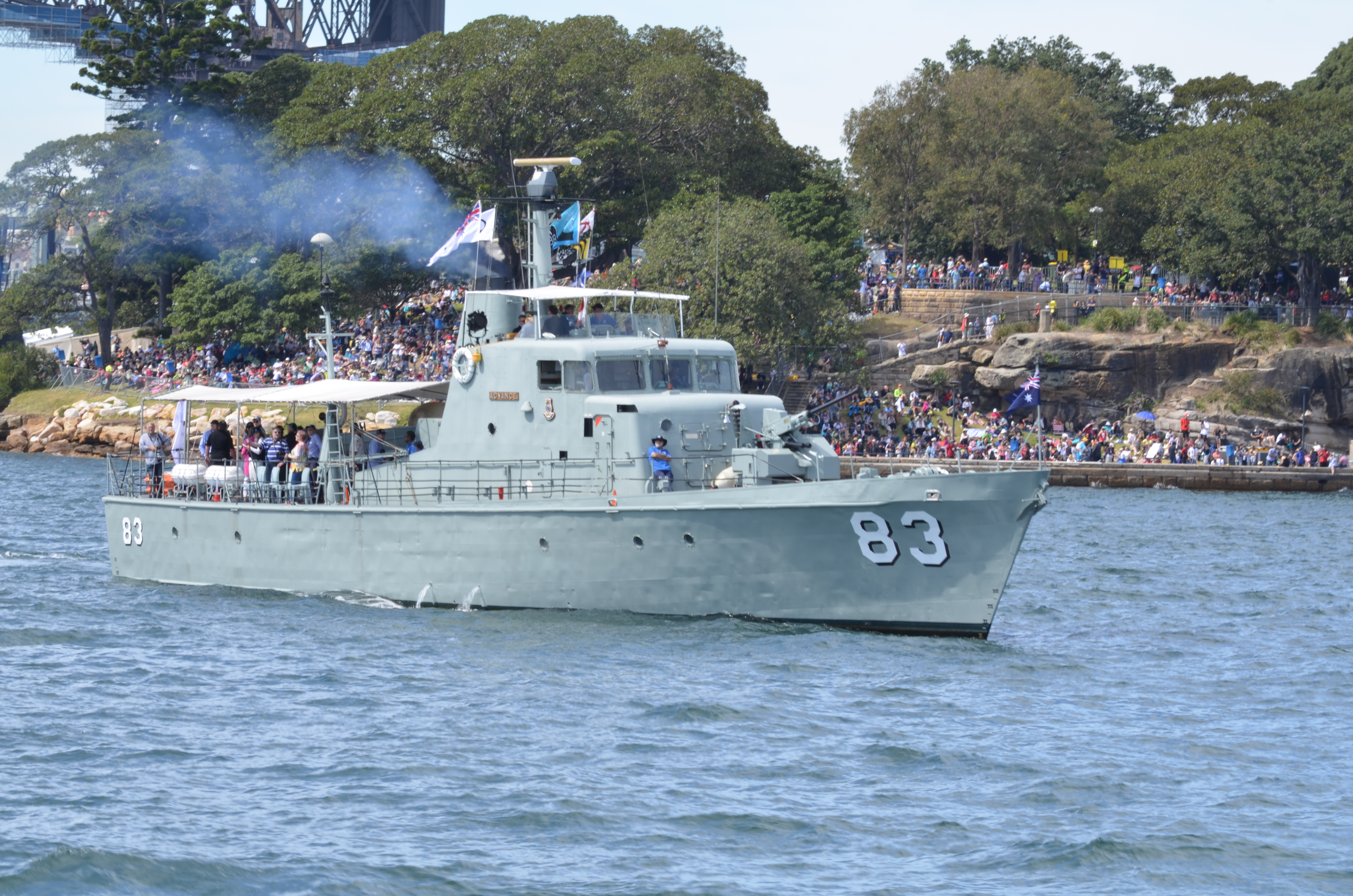
- HMAS Advance on Sydney Harbour in October 2013

History

Australia
- Builder: Walkers Limited, Queensland
- Laid down: March 1967
- Launched: 16 August 1967
- Commissioned: 24 January 1968
- Decommissioned: 6 February 1988
- Motto: "Never Look Back"
- Status: Museum ship at the Australian National Maritime Museum
- Badge

General characteristics
- Class & type: Attack-class patrol boat
- Displacement: 100 tons standard; 146 tons full load
- Length: 107.6 ft (32.8 m) length overall
- Beam: 20 ft (6.1 m)
- Draught: 6.4 ft (2.0 m) at standard load; 7.3 ft (2.2 m) at full load
- Propulsion: 2 × 16-cylinder Paxman YJCM diesel engines; 3,460 shp (2,580 kW); 2 shafts
- Speed: 24 knots (44 km/h; 28 mph)
- Range: 1,200 nmi (2,200 km; 1,400 mi) at 13 knots (24 km/h; 15 mph)
- Complement: 3 officers, 16 sailors
- Armament: 1 × Bofors 40 mm gun; 2 × .50-calibre M2 Browning machine guns; Small arms

HMAS Advance (P 83) is a decommissioned Attack-class patrol boat of the Royal Australian Navy (RAN). Constructed during 1967 and commissioned into the RAN in 1968, Advance operated from Darwin and patrolled northern Australian waters.

During her career, the patrol boat shadowed a Soviet trawler, survived Cyclone Tracy, was used for filming of the television series Patrol Boat, and participated in the RAN's first anti-terrorism patrol of the North West Shelf. Advance was replaced in 1980, but continued to operate as a training ship until she was decommissioned in 1988.

Advance was donated to the Australian National Maritime Museum, which has maintained her in an operational condition.

== Design and construction ==
The Attack class was ordered in 1964 to operate in Australian waters as patrol boats based on lessons learned through using the Ton-class minesweepers on patrols of Borneo during the Indonesia-Malaysia Confrontation, and to replace a variety of old patrol, search-and-rescue, and general-purpose craft. Initially, nine were ordered for the RAN, with another five for Papua New Guinea's Australian-run coastal security force, although another six ships were ordered to bring the class to twenty vessels. The patrol boats had a displacement of 100 tons at standard load and 146 tons at full load, were 107.6 feet (32.8 m) in length overall, had a beam of 20 feet (6.1 m), and draughts of 6.4 feet (2.0 m) at standard load, and 7.3 feet (2.2 m) at full load. Propulsion machinery consisted of two 16-cylinder Paxman YJCM diesel engines, which supplied 3,460 shaft horsepower (2,580 kW) to the two propellers. The vessels could achieve a top speed of 24 knots (44 km/h; 28 mph), and had a range of 1,200 nautical miles (2,200 km; 1,400 mi) at 13 knots (24 km/h; 15 mph). The ship's company consisted of three officers and sixteen sailors. Main armament was a bow-mounted Bofors 40 mm gun, supplemented by two .50-calibre M2 Browning machine guns and various small arms. The ships were designed with as many commercial components as possible: the Attacks were to operate in remote regions of Australia and New Guinea, and a town's hardware store would be more accessible than home base in a mechanical emergency.

Advance was laid down by Walkers Limited at Maryborough, Queensland in March 1967, launched on 16 August 1967, and commissioned on 24 January 1968. It was the third ship of its class.

== Operational history ==
Advance operated out of HMAS Coonawarra in Darwin, Northern Territory between 1968 and 1980. As well as the standard duties for her class, Advance was also used for surveillance, search-and-rescue, and hydrographic survey (in company with the survey ship HMAS Moresby).

During 1968, Advance and sister ship Attack shadowed the Soviet trawler Van Gogh, which operated in the Gulf of Carpentaria for two months.

Advance and three other patrol boats were in Darwin Harbour on 25 December 1974, when Cyclone Tracy hit. Advance and Assail managed to escape serious damage, but Attack was forced aground and suffered hull damage, and Arrow collided with Stoke's Hill Wharf and sank.

During 1975 and 1976, Advance regularly operated as part of Operation Trochus: a concentrated effort to respond to illegal fishing vessels in northern Australian waters.

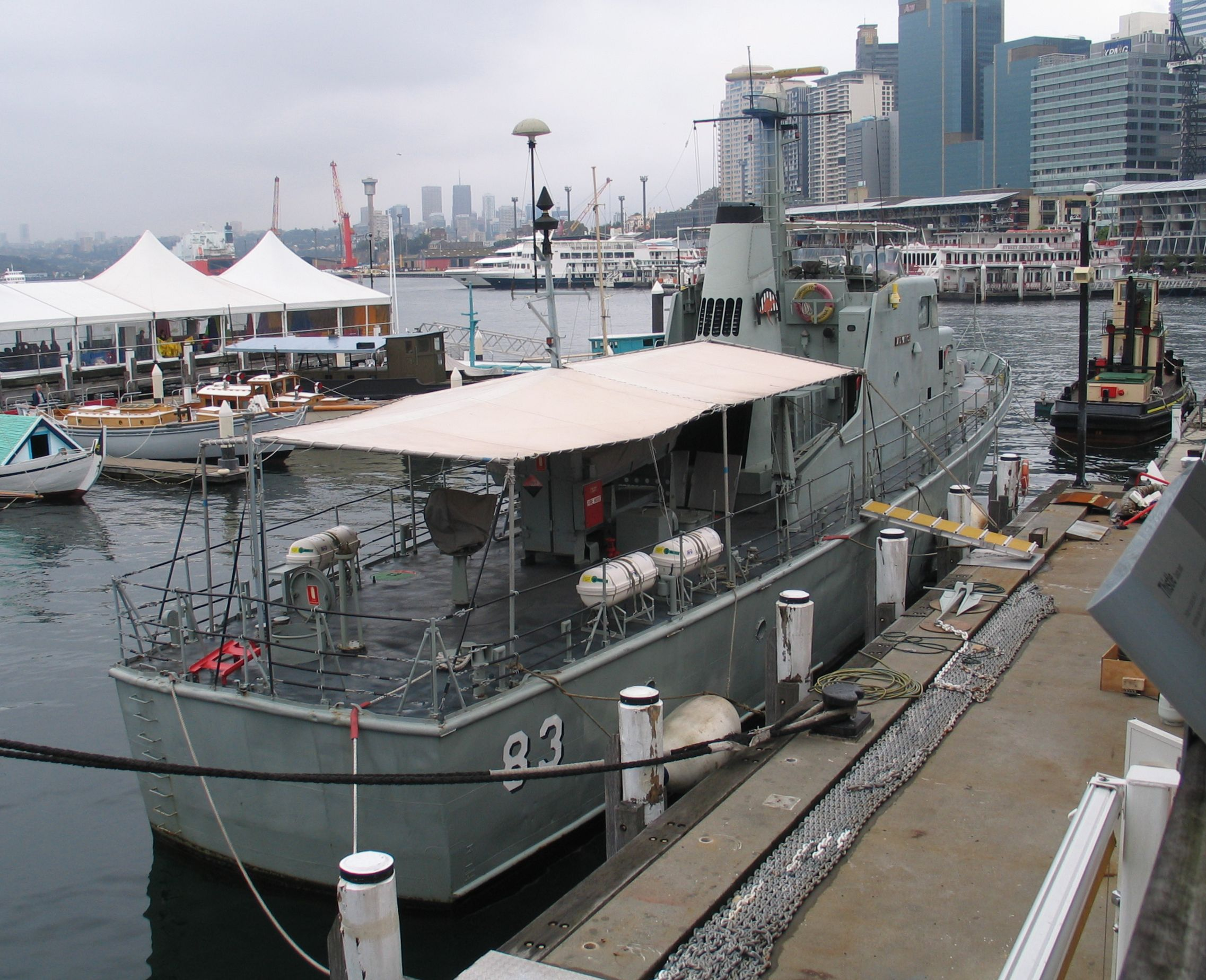
Stern view of Advance

From late 1977, the patrol boat was assigned to HMAS Waterhen in Sydney for patrols along Australia's eastern coast, but was redeployed elsewhere when necessary.

In 1979, Advance was one of two Attack-class vessels used to portray the fictional HMAS Ambush; setting of the ABC television series Patrol Boat.

Following her replacement by a Fremantle-class patrol boat in 1980, Advance was reassigned as a training ship. She was assigned to the Sydney Port Division of the Royal Australian Navy Reserve in February 1982.

The patrol boat participated in the 1986 Naval Review.

== Decommissioning and preservation ==
Advance was decommissioned on 6 February 1988, and was transferred to the Australian National Maritime Museum (ANMM).

The patrol boat has been maintained in operational condition by the ANMM.

In October 2013 Advance participated in the International Fleet Review 2013 in Sydney, celebrating the centenary of the Royal Australian Navy.
