= Attacker =

An attacker is someone who attacks or a type of player in some sports.

For the term attacker in computer security, see Hacker (computer security), Adversary (cryptography), and Adversary model. Attacker may also refer to:

- Attacker-class escort carrier, a class of escort aircraft carriers of the British Royal Navy
- Attacker-class patrol boat, a class of British-built patrol boats
- HMS Attacker, more than one ship of the British Royal Navy
- Supermarine Attacker, a British aircraft
- Attacker (band), an American heavy metal band
- Attack Aircraft, some times called attackers.

== See also ==
- Attack (disambiguation)
- Attackers
