= Attack =

Attack may refer to:

== Warfare and combat ==
- Attack (fencing)
- Charge (warfare)
- Offensive (military)
- Strike (attack)

== Books and publishing ==
- The Attack (novel), a book
- Attack No. 1, comic and animation
- Attack! Books, a publisher
- Attack! (periodical), a tabloid white supremacist periodical
- Der Angriff, a.k.a. The Attack, a newspaper franchise
- In newspaper headlines, to save space, sometimes "criticise"

== Films and television ==
- Attack! The Battle of New Britain, a 1944 American armed forces documentary film
- Attack (1956 film), also known as Attack!, a 1956 American war film
- Attack (2016 film), a 2016 Telugu film
- Attack: Part 1 (2022 film), a 2022 Hindi film
- The Attack (1966 film), an Australian television play
- The Attack (2012 film), a 2012 film directed by Ziad Doueiri
- "The Attack" (Australian Playhouse)
- "The Attack", a season 7 episode of Lego Ninjago: Masters of Spinjitzu

== Music ==
- Attack Records, a record label
- Attack (music), the prefix or initial phase of a sound
- Attacca, the immediate joining of a musical movement to a previous one

=== Bands ===
- Attack (band), a 1980s band
- The Attack (band), a 1960s band
- Attack Attack!, a metalcore band

=== Albums ===
- Attack!! (2002), an album by Yngwie J. Malmsteen
- The Attack (2007), an album by Jah Jah
- Attack Attack! (album), 2010
- Attack (AAA album), 2006
- Attack (Disciple album), 2014

=== Songs ===
- "Attack!", by The Toys
- "Attack" (Thirty Seconds to Mars song), 2005
- "Attack", a song from the System of a Down album Hypnotize, 2005
- "Attack", a song from the Joe Satriani album Engines of Creation, 2000

== Ships ==
- HMAS Attack (P 90), the lead ship of the Attack class patrol boats of the Royal Australian Navy
- HMS Attack, three ships and a shore establishment of the Royal Navy
- Attack-class submarine, planned Royal Navy submarines, cancelled in 2012

== Sports ==
- An alternative name for the offense
- The bowling attack in cricket

== Other ==
- Attack! (board game), 2003
- The Attack (video game), a 1981 game for the TI-99/4A computer
- Attack (political party), a political party in Bulgaria
- The Attack (painting), a 1899 painting by the Finnish artist Edvar Isto

== See also ==
- Atack, a surname
- ATTAC or Association pour la taxation des transactions financières et pour l'action citoyenne, activist organization
