= Wembley Stadium =

Stadium in London, England

Coordinates: 51°33′20″N 0°16′46″W

- "The Home of Football"; New Wembley

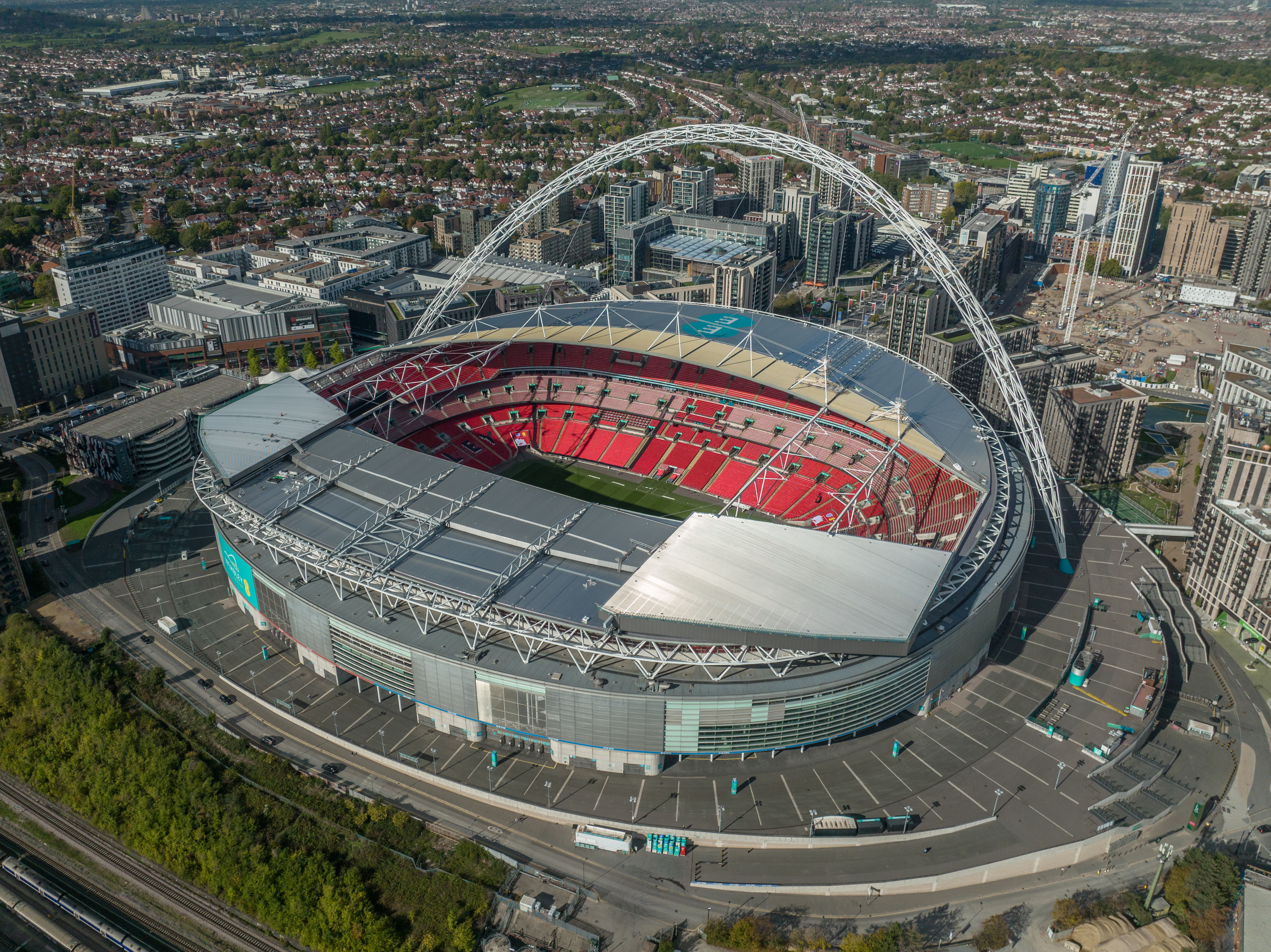
- UEFA
- Interactive map of Wembley Stadium
- Full name: Wembley Stadium connected by EE
- Address: South Way; Wembley; HA9 0WS
- Location: London, United Kingdom
- Owner: The Football Association
- Operator: Wembley National Stadium Limited
- Capacity: 90,000 (association football, rugby union, rugby league, boxing); 75,000 to 90,000 seated and 25,000 standing (concerts); 86,000 to 87,000 (UEFA capacity); 86,000 (American football)
- Executive suites: 166
- Roof: Partially retractable
- Surface: GrassMaster
- Record attendance: Football: 90,000 Sidemen Charity Match 2025; Concert: 98,000 (Adele, June 2017); Boxing: 98,128 (Anthony Joshua vs. Daniel Dubois, 21 September 2024); Rugby Union: 89,267 (Ireland vs Romania, 2015 Rugby World Cup, September 2015); NFL: 86,651 (New England Patriots vs. Jacksonville Jaguars, 20 October 2024); Rugby league: 85,217 (Warrington Wolves vs. Leeds Rhinos, 28 August 2010); Wrestling: 72,265 (AEW All In, 27 August 2023)
- Field size: 115 yd × 74 yd (105 m × 68 m)
- Public transit: Wembley Park; Wembley Central; Wembley Stadium

Construction
- Groundbreaking: 30 September 2002; 24 years ago
- Built: 2003–2007
- Opened: 9 March 2007; 19 years ago
- Cost: £789 million (£1.41 billion today)
- Architects: HOK Sport, Foster and Partners, Nathaniel Lichfield and Partners (planning consultants)
- Project manager: Capita Property and Infrastructure
- Structural engineers: Mott Stadium Consortium and Jimmy Higham, Mott MacDonald, Sinclair Knight Merz & Aurecon
- Services engineer: Jimmy Higham
- General contractor: Multiplex

Tenants
- England national football team (2007–present); Tottenham Hotspur (2017–2019)

Website
- wembleystadium.com

Wembley Stadium, branded as Wembley Stadium connected by EE for sponsorship reasons, is an association football stadium in Wembley, London, England. It opened in 2007 on the site of the original Wembley Stadium, which had stood from 1923 until 2000. The stadium is England's national football stadium, and thus hosts the majority of the England national team home matches and the FA Cup Final – the final of England's primary domestic club football competition. It is considered one of the most well known football stadiums in the world, and is considered a hub for the English game. Wembley Stadium is owned by the governing body of English football, the Football Association, whose headquarters are in the stadium, through its subsidiary Wembley National Stadium Ltd (WNSL). With 90,000 seats, it is the largest stadium in the UK and the second-largest stadium in Europe, behind Barcelona's Camp Nou.

Designed by Populous and Foster and Partners, the stadium is crowned by the 134-metre-high (440 ft) Wembley Arch which serves aesthetically as a landmark across London as well as structurally, with the arch supporting over 75% of the entire roof load. The stadium was built by Australian firm Multiplex at a cost of £798 million (£1.41 billion today). Two partially retractable roof structures over the east and west ends of the stadium can be opened to allow sunlight and aid pitch growth.

In addition to England home games and the FA Cup final, the stadium also hosts other major games in English football, including the season-opening FA Community Shield, the finals of lower tiered cup competition – the FA Trophy, the FA Vase, finals of the EFL Cup and EFL Trophy, the FA Cup semi-finals, and the promotion play-off finals of the tiers two, three, four, and five of the English football league system. The stadium also hosts the Women's FA Cup finals and an increasing number of home games of the England women's national football team.

A UEFA category four stadium, Wembley hosted the 2011, 2013 and the 2024 Champions League Finals, eight games at UEFA Euro 2020 (including the final and both of the semi-finals), and hosted the final of the UEFA Women's Euro 2022. The stadium hosted the gold-medal matches at the 2012 Olympic Games football tournament. The stadium also hosts the Rugby Football League's Challenge Cup, Women's Challenge Cup, and 1895 Cup finals, in addition to various music concerts. The stadium also hosts NFL London Games and was the temporary home of Premier League football club Tottenham Hotspur between August 2017 and March 2019, while White Hart Lane was being demolished and their new stadium was constructed. Wembley has also been chosen as one of the host stadia for UEFA Euro 2028.

In 2014, Wembley Stadium entered into a six-year sponsorship agreement with mobile provider EE, under which it provides technology and infrastructure services for the venue. Under the agreement, the facility is officially referred to as "Wembley Stadium connected by EE". The deal was renewed in 2019 and again in 2025 for a further four years, through to 2028.

== Stadium ==
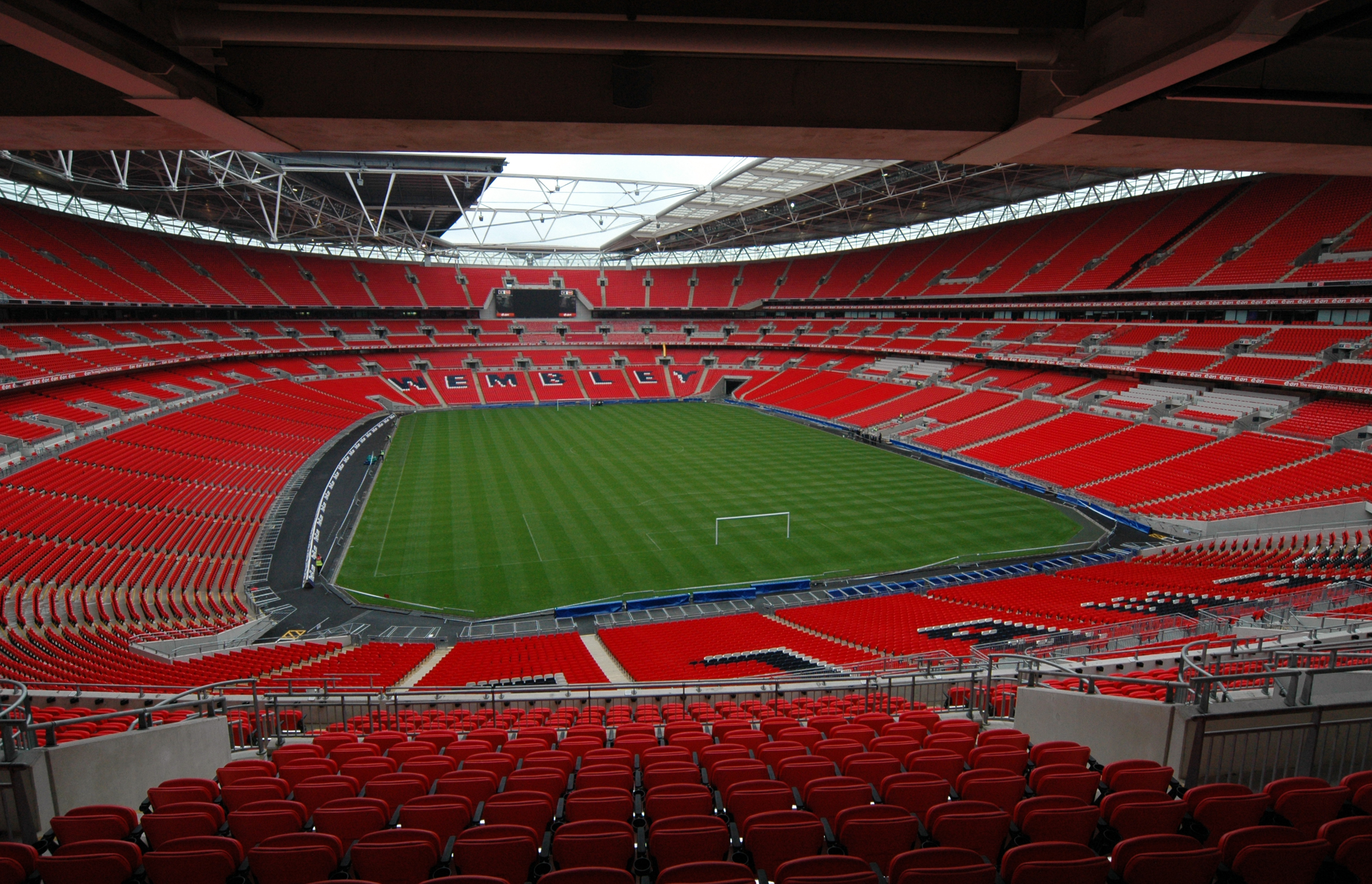
Wembley Stadium interior

Wembley was designed by architects Foster + Partners and HOK Sport (now Populous) and with engineers Mott Stadium Consortium, who were a collection of three structural engineering consultants in the form of Mott MacDonald, Sinclair Knight Merz and Aurecon. The design of the building services was carried out by Mott MacDonald. The construction of the stadium was managed by Australian company Multiplex and funded by Sport England, WNSL (Wembley National Stadium Limited), the Football Association, the Department for Digital, Culture, Media and Sport and the London Development Agency. It is one of the most expensive stadia ever built at a cost of £798 million in 2007, and has the largest roof-covered seating capacity in the world. Nathaniel Lichfield and Partners was appointed to assist Wembley National Stadium Limited in preparing the scheme for a new stadium and to obtain planning and listed building permission for the development.

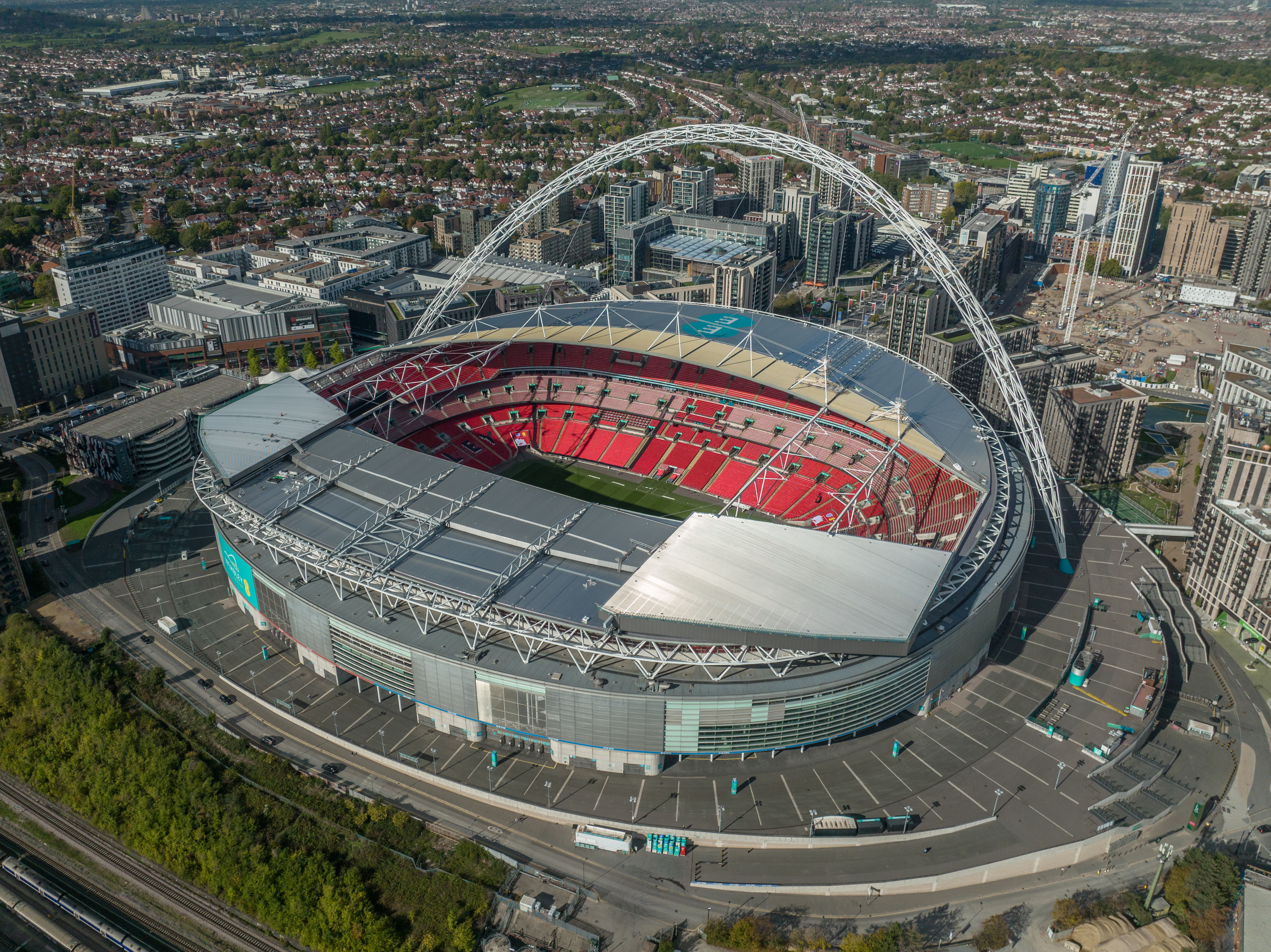
Aerial view of the stadium in the day

The all-seater stadium is a bowl design with a capacity of 90,000, protected from the elements by a sliding roof that does not completely enclose it. The stadium's signature feature is a circular section lattice arch of 7 m (23 ft) internal diameter with a 315 m (1,033 ft) span, erected some 22° off true, and rising to 133 m (436 ft). It supports all the weight of the north roof and 60% of the weight of the retractable roof on the southern side. The arch is the world's longest unsupported roof structure.

A platform system was designed in order to temporarily convert the stadium to athletics use, but its use would decrease the stadium's capacity to approximately 60,000. No athletics events (track and field) have taken place at the stadium; the conversion for athletics use was a condition of part of the lottery funding the stadium received, but to convert it would take weeks of work and cost millions of pounds. Instead, with the awarding of the 2012 Summer Olympic Games to London in 2005, the London Olympic Stadium has been used for major athletics events since 2012.

=== Construction ===
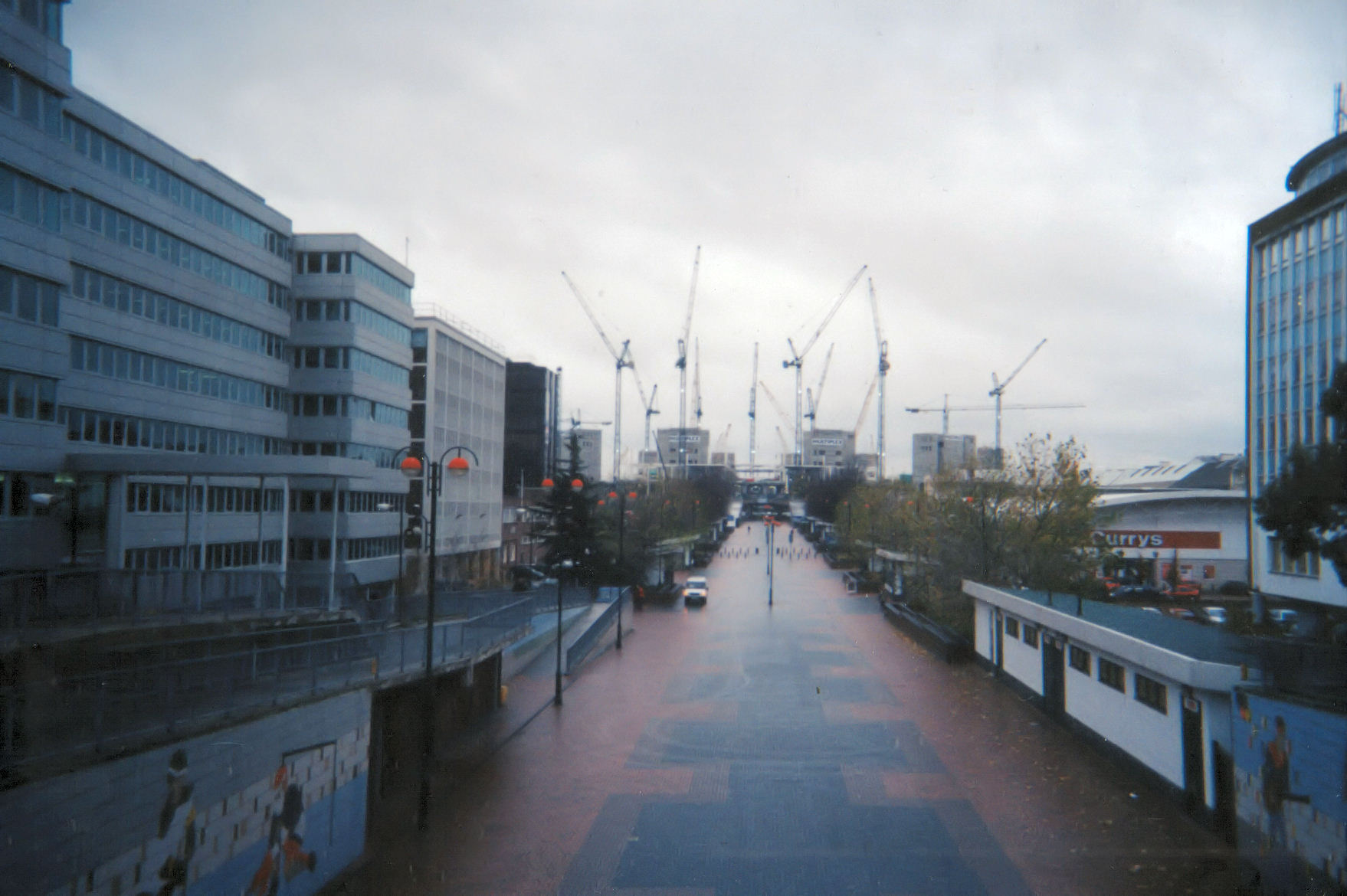
The stadium in its very early stages of construction c. August 2003

The initial plan for the reconstruction of Wembley Stadium was for demolition to begin before Christmas 2000, and for the new stadium to be completed some time during 2003, but this work was delayed by a succession of financial and legal difficulties. In 2004, London Mayor Ken Livingstone and Brent Council also announced wider plans for the regeneration of Wembley, taking in the arena and the surrounding areas as well as the stadium, to be implemented over two or three decades. Demolition officially began on 30 September 2002, with the Twin Towers being dismantled in December 2002.

Delays to the construction project started as far back as 2003. In December 2003, the constructors of the arch, subcontractors Cleveland Bridge & Engineering Company of Darlington, warned Multiplex about rising costs. Cleveland Bridge withdrew from the project and were replaced by Dutch firm Hollandia, with all the attendant problems of starting over. 2004 also saw errors, most notably a fatal accident involving carpenter Patrick O'Sullivan for which construction firm PC Harrington Contractors were fined £150,000 in relation to breaches of health and safety laws.

In October 2005, Sports Minister Richard Caborn announced: "They say the Cup Final will be there, barring six feet of snow or something like that". By November 2005, WNSL were still hopeful of a handover date of 31 March, in time for the cup final on 13 May. However, in December 2005, the builders admitted that there was a "material risk" that the stadium might not be ready in time for the final. In February 2006 these worries were confirmed, with the FA moving the game to Cardiff's Millennium Stadium.

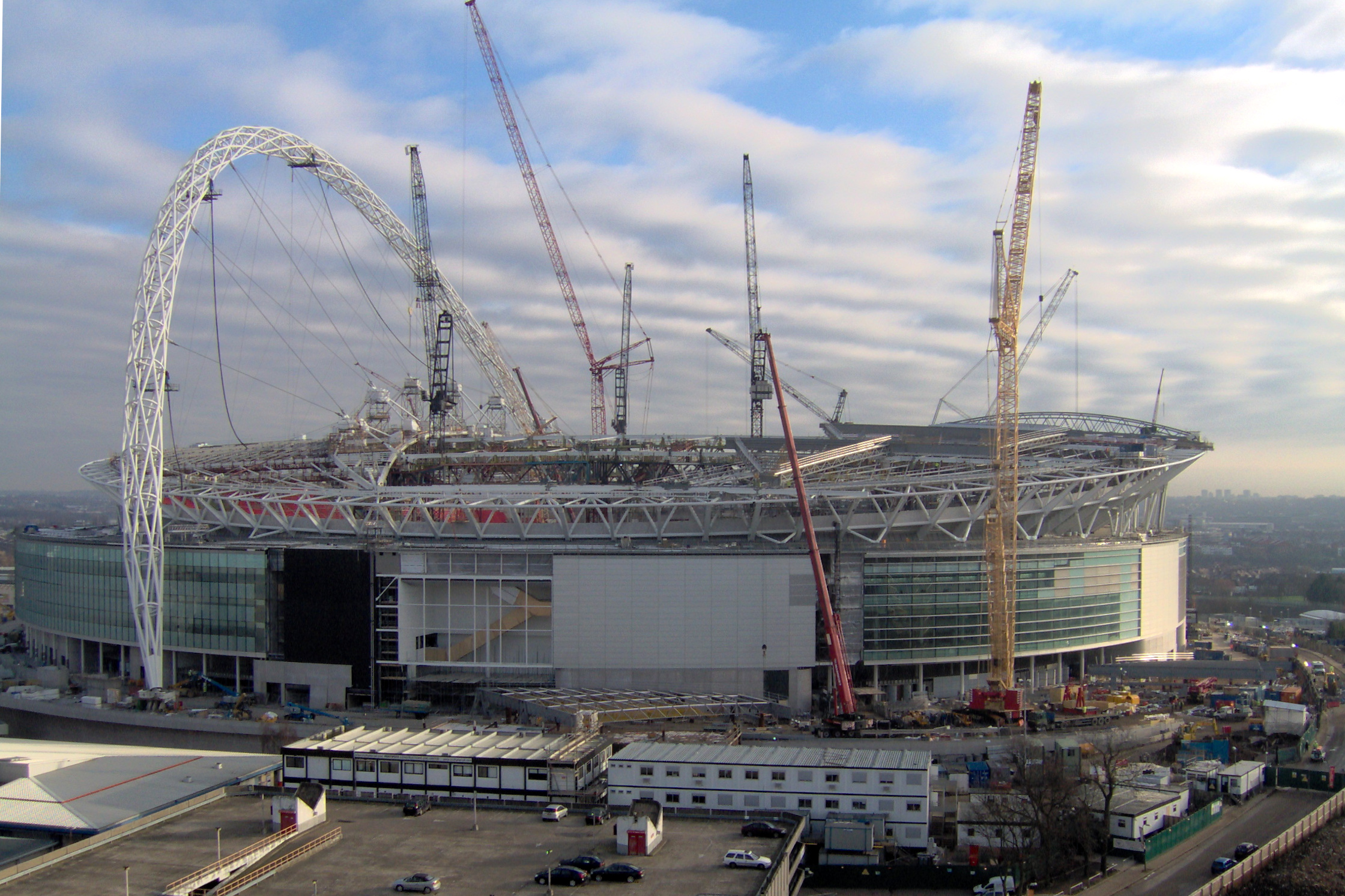
Construction of the new Wembley, looking east, taken January 2006

On 20 March 2006, a steel rafter in the roof of the new development fell by 1 1/2 ft (46 cm), forcing 3,000 workers to evacuate the stadium and raising further doubts over the completion date which was already behind schedule. On 23 March 2006, sewers beneath the stadium buckled due to ground movement. GMB Union leader Steve Kelly said that the problem had been caused by the pipes not being properly laid, and that the repair would take months. A spokesman for developers Multiplex said that they did not believe this would "have any impact on the completion of the stadium", which was then scheduled to be completed on 31 March 2006.

On 30 March 2006, the developers announced that Wembley Stadium would not be ready until 2007. All competitions and concerts planned were to be moved to suitable locations. On 19 June 2006, it was announced that the turf had been laid. On 19 October 2006 it was announced that the venue was now set to open in early 2007 after the dispute between the Football Association and Multiplex had finally been settled. WNSL was expected to pay around £36m to Multiplex, on top of the amount of the original fixed-price contract. The total cost of the project (including local transport infrastructure redevelopment and the cost of financing) was estimated to be £1 billion.

For the new stadium the level of the pitch was lowered. During excavation of the new playing field, mechanical diggers unearthed a buried obstruction: the concrete foundations of Watkin's Tower, a failed attempt to construct a rival to the Eiffel Tower in London. Only the base of the tower was ever built before being abandoned and demolished in 1907; the site was later used as the location for the first Wembley Stadium.

=== Handover and opening ===
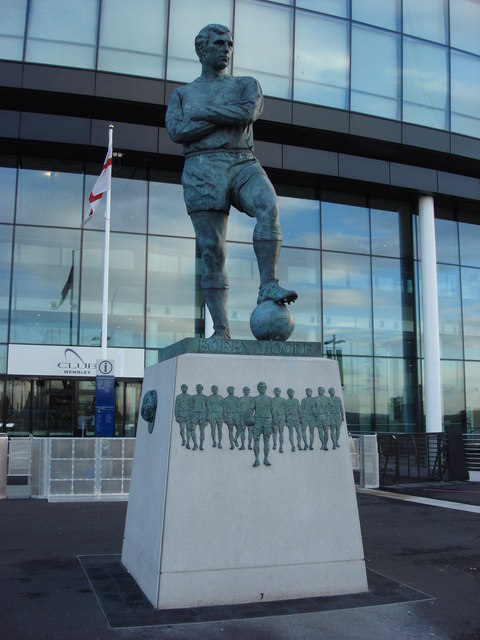
Statue of Bobby Moore, England's 1966 FIFA World Cup winning captain, stands outside the stadium entrance looking down Olympic Way.

The new stadium was completed and handed over to the FA on 9 March 2007. The official Wembley Stadium website had announced that the stadium would be open for public viewing for local residents of Brent on 3 March 2007, however this was delayed by two weeks and instead happened on 17 March.

While the stadium had hosted football matches since the handover in March, the stadium was officially opened on Saturday 19 May, with the staging of the 2007 FA Cup Final. Eight days before that on Friday 11 May, the statue of Bobby Moore had been unveiled by his former England teammate Bobby Charlton outside the stadium entrance, as the "finishing touch" to the completion of the stadium. The twice life-size bronze statue, sculpted by Philip Jackson, depicts England's 1966 World Cup winning captain Bobby Moore, looking down Olympic Way.

=== Structure ===
- The stadium contains 2,618 toilets, more than any other venue in the world.
- The stadium has a circumference of 1 km (0.62 mi).
- The bowl volume is listed at 1,139,100 m^{3} (1,489,900 yd^{3}), somewhat smaller than the Millennium Stadium in Cardiff, but with a greater seating capacity.
- At its peak, there were more than 3,500 construction workers on site.
- 4,000 separate piles form the foundations of the new stadium, the deepest of which is 35 m (115 ft).
- There are 56 km (35 mi) of heavy-duty power cables in the stadium.
- 90,000 m^{3} (120,000 yd^{3}) of concrete and 23,000 tonnes (25,000 short tons) of steel were used in the construction of the new stadium.
- The total length of the escalators is 400 metres (1/4 mi).
- The arch has a cross-sectional diameter greater than that of a cross-channel Eurostar train.

=== Pitch ===
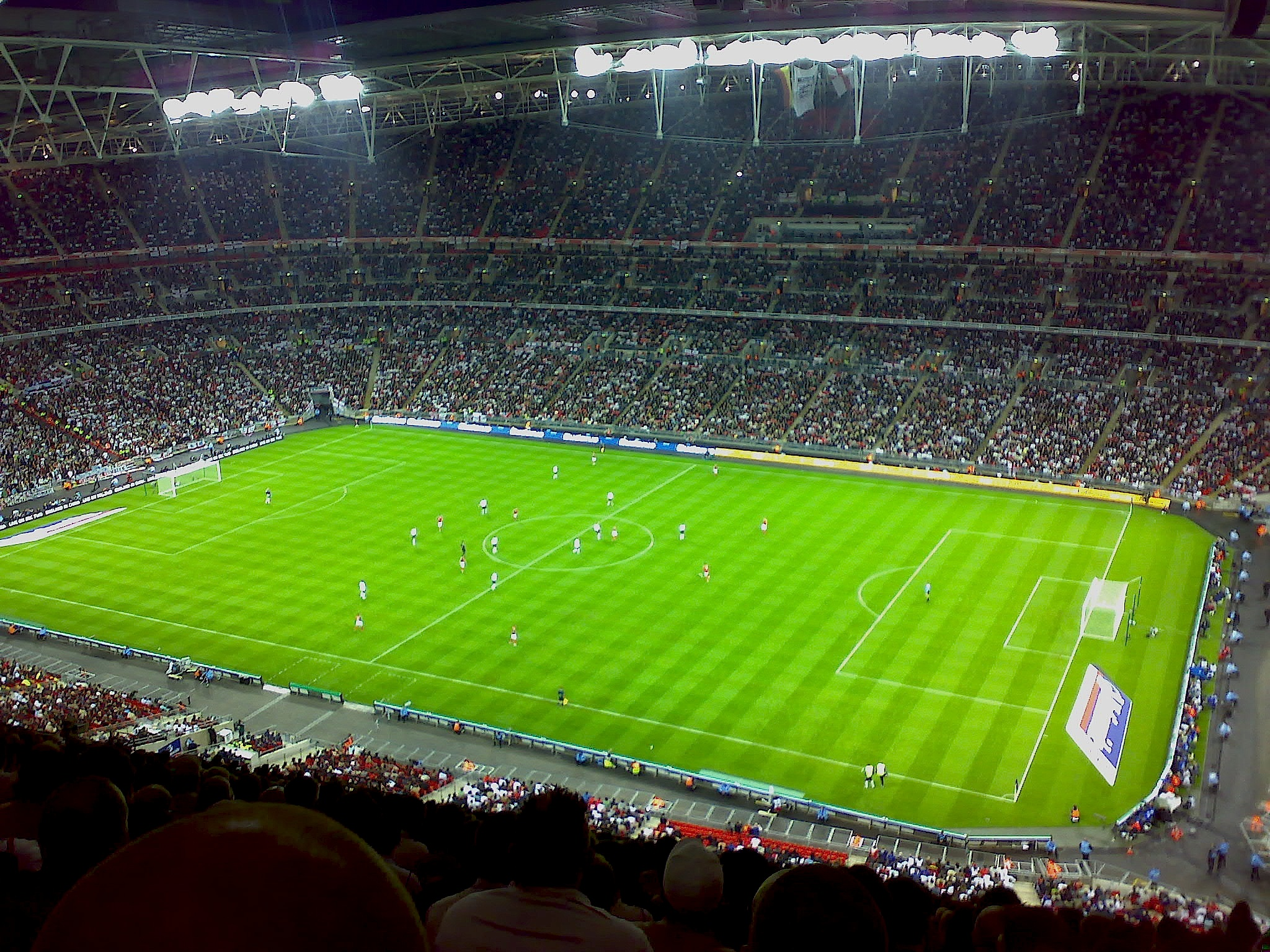
Wembley Stadium pitch during England friendly against Germany in August 2007

The pitch size, as lined for association football, is 115 yd (105 m) long by 75 yd (69 m) wide, slightly narrower than the old Wembley, as required by the UEFA stadium categories for a category four stadium, the top category.

In a period after the completion of the new Wembley, the pitch came into disrepute. It was described as being "no good" and "not in the condition that Wembley used to be known for" by Slaven Bilić before a game between England and the team he managed, Croatia, in November 2007. The pitch was cut up during the game, which was blamed by some as the reason England did not qualify for UEFA Euro 2008. The Football Association admitted in April 2009, after the FA Cup semi-finals, that improvements were needed to the Wembley pitch, after criticism of the surface by coaches Alex Ferguson, Arsène Wenger and David Moyes.

In March 2010, the surface was relaid for the tenth time since opening. In April 2010, the pitch was again criticised following the FA Cup semi-finals, during which the players found it difficult to keep their footing and the surface cut up despite the dry conditions. The then Tottenham Hotspur boss, Harry Redknapp, labelled it a "disgrace" after his side's semi-final defeat to Portsmouth. After the 2010 FA Cup Final, Chelsea captain John Terry said: "The pitch ruined the final. It's probably the worst pitch we've played on all year. It was not good enough for a Wembley pitch." The stadium was then relaid with a Desso GrassMaster semi-artificial pitch, ahead of the 2010 community shield game between Chelsea and Manchester United. Michael Owen, who previously criticised the pitch for causing him injury, said that it was much improved.

In 2023, the stadium switched to a carpet lay and play system.

Wembley has been used for American football matches in the National Football League's International Series. Tottenham Hotspur hosted Manchester City in a Premier League match on 29 October 2018, a day after Wembley hosted the Philadelphia Eagles and Jacksonville Jaguars. Due to the short turnaround, faded gridiron markings and the NFL logo were clearly visible on the pitch along with worn grass along the centre of the pitch and the touch-lines. Tottenham were forced to hold the match at Wembley due to construction delays to their new ground. Despite the pitch's condition, UEFA allowed a Champions League leg to be played at Wembley on 6 November 2018 with Tottenham hosting Dutch side PSV Eindhoven.

=== Covering ===
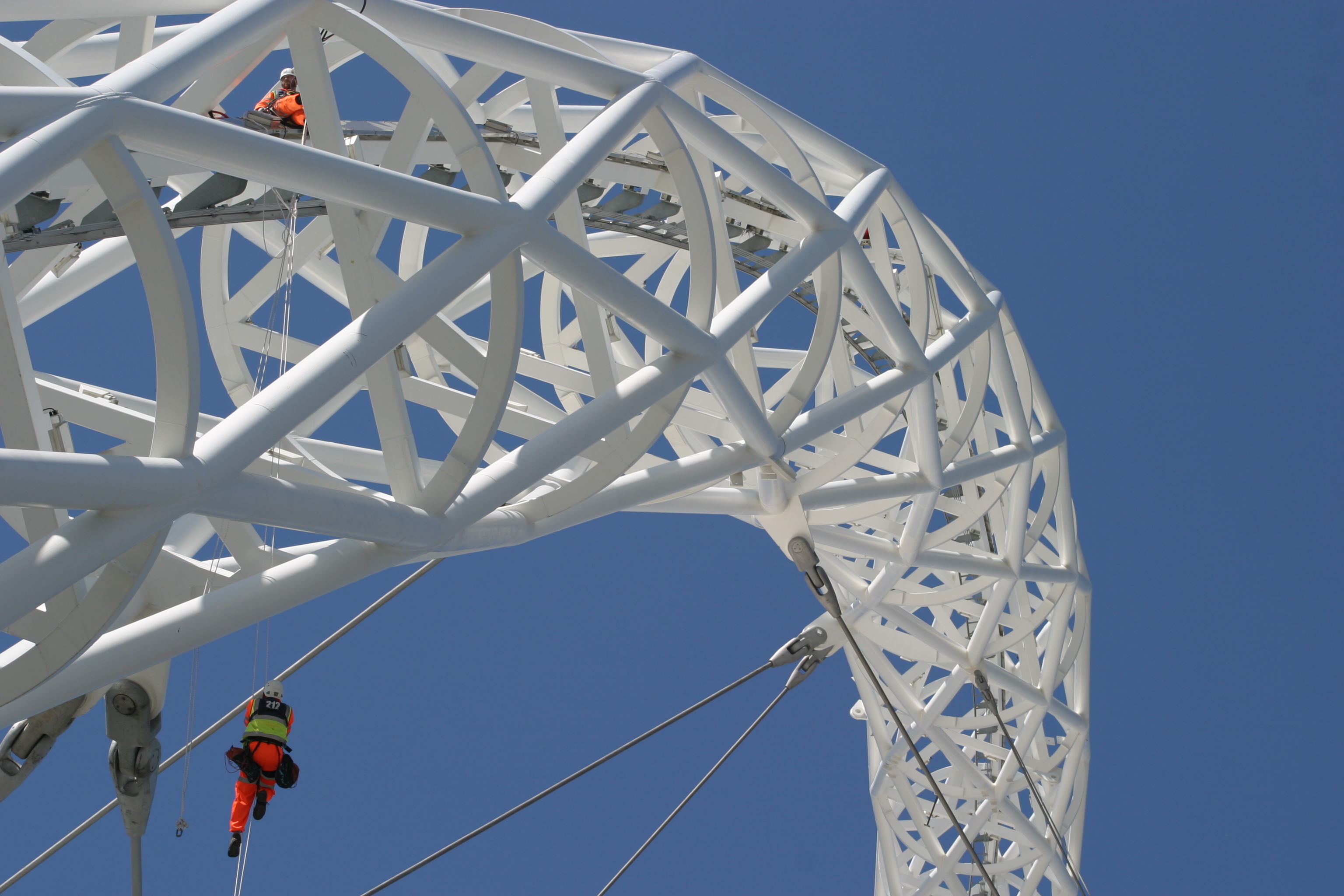
Closeup of the arch

The stadium roof has an area of 40,000 m^{2} (430,000 ft^{2}), of which 13,722 m^{2} (147,700 ft^{2}) is movable. The primary reason for the sliding roof was to avoid shading the pitch, as grass demands direct sunlight to grow effectively. The sliding roof design minimises the shadow by having the roof pulled back on the east, west and south. Angus Campbell, the chief architect, also said that an aim was for the pitch to be in sunlight during matches played between 3 pm and 5 pm from the beginning of May to the end of June, when the FA and World Cups would be played. However, it was mentioned during live commentary of the mid-May 2007 FA Cup Final that the pitch was in partial shade at the start at 3 pm and also during the match.

The stadium roof rises to 52 metres (171 ft) above the pitch and is supported by an arch rising 133 m (436 ft) above the level of the external concourse. With a span of 315 m (1,033 ft), the arch is the longest single-span roof structure in the world.

=== Safety and security ===
Safety and security at Wembley Stadium are managed in partnership with the Metropolitan Police, Brent Council and other agencies, with event day operations including extensive pre event planning and coordination. Measures introduced at the venue have included enhanced turnstiles, a new command and control room, additional CCTV coverage and strengthened perimeter doors and fencing, together with a Public Space Protection Order in the surrounding area that restricts street drinking, ticket touting and the use of pyrotechnics on event days. Stadium information and spectator guides describe the use of stewards and security staff, controlled entry points, bag checks and limits on prohibited items such as flares and smoke devices.

Following serious disorder at the UEFA Euro 2020 final between England and Italy, when numbers of ticketless supporters breached cordons and entered Wembley, an independent review led by Baroness Cassey described the day as "a source of national shame" and recommended stronger physical and operational safeguard. Brent Council subsequently approved plans to reinforce the security line around the stadium, including a higher perimeter fence and other measures intended to prevent similar incursions.

In May 2026, the FA Cup final at Wembley took place on the same day as a pro-Palestinian Nakba Day march and the "Unite the Kingdom" rally in central London. As part of a wider "significant public order policing operation," officers monitored CCTV feeds from the FA Cup final to identify supporters travelling towards the demonstrations. The Metropolitan Police reported 22 arrests at the FA Cup final itself, alongside 43 arrests connected to the two marches, and said four officers were assaulted and six were subjected to hate crime offences.

=== Litigation ===
The Australian firm Multiplex, which was the main contractor on Wembley Stadium, made significant losses on the project. In an attempt to recoup some of those losses, the firm initiated a number of legal cases against its sub-contractors and consultants. The largest of these – the largest construction claim in UK legal history – was a claim for £253 million against the structural engineering consultants Mott MacDonald.

In preliminary hearings the two architecture practices which worked for Multiplex on the project were ordered to allow Multiplex access to their records for them to build a case. The practices, Foster + Partners and Populous, estimated the costs of providing access and answering Multiplex's queries at £5 million. Mott MacDonald issued a counter-claim for unpaid fees of £250,000.

The dispute between Multiplex and Mott MacDonald was settled out of court in June 2010, ahead of a January 2011 trial. The terms of the settlement not disclosed, but it was reported that Multiplex "would not be out of pocket".

Multiplex also took the original steel contractor, Cleveland Bridge, to court claiming £38 million compensation for costs resulting from Cleveland Bridge withdrawing from the project. Cleveland Bridge, in turn, claimed up to £15 million from Multiplex. The case was resolved in September 2008 with Cleveland Bridge ordered to pay £6.1 million in damages and 20% of Multiplex's costs, after the court found against Cleveland Bridge. The judge criticised both sides for allowing the case to reach court, pointing out that total costs were £22 million, including £1 million for photocopying. Multiplex's ultimate bill is estimated to be over £10 million. In 2007, Multiplex also contested a claim from its concrete contractor, PC Harrington, that Multiplex owes £13.4 million to PC Harrington.

=== Bid to buy ===
In April 2018, Shahid Khan, the owner of Fulham and the Jacksonville Jaguars, put forward an offer to purchase Wembley Stadium from the FA. The deal included not only the purchase of the stadium, but also providing the FA full rights to keep control of the Club Wembley business. On 18 July 2018, a parliamentary select committee was held to discuss the possible sale, with evidence being given by former player, Gary Neville, and Katrina Law of the Football Supporters' Federation. The offer was withdrawn on 17 October 2018.

== Sport ==
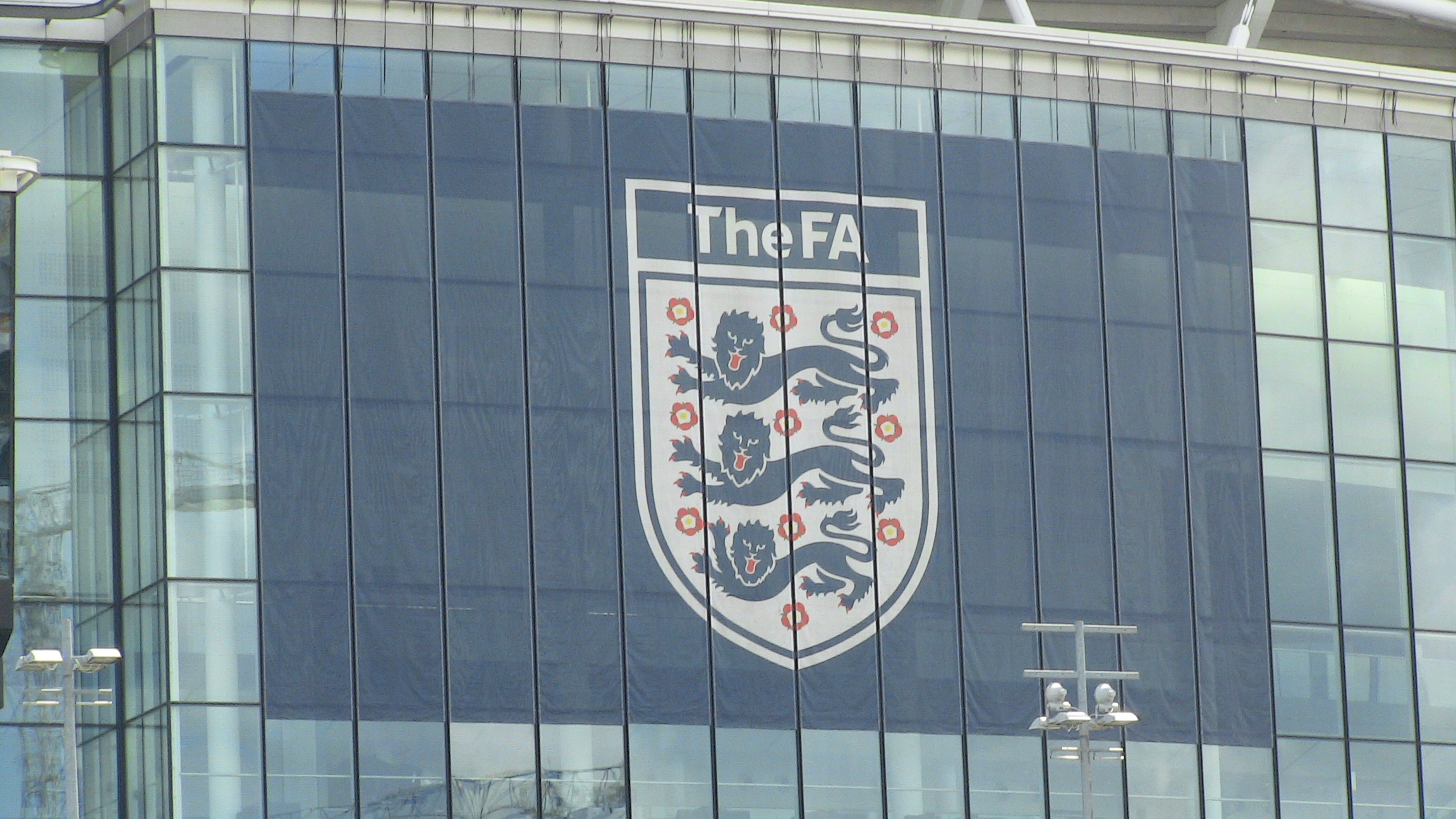
Logo of the governing body of English football, the FA, as displayed on the exterior of Wembley Stadium

Given the ownership of the stadium by the Football Association (the governing body of English football), the England national football team is a major user of Wembley. In 2007, the League Cup final moved back to Wembley from Cardiff following the FA Cup final and FA Community Shield. Other showpiece football matches that were previously staged at Wembley, such as the Football League promotion play-offs and the Football League Trophy final, have returned to the stadium. In addition, the Conference National (now National League) play-off final is held at Wembley since 2007, and the FA Women's Cup final since 2015.

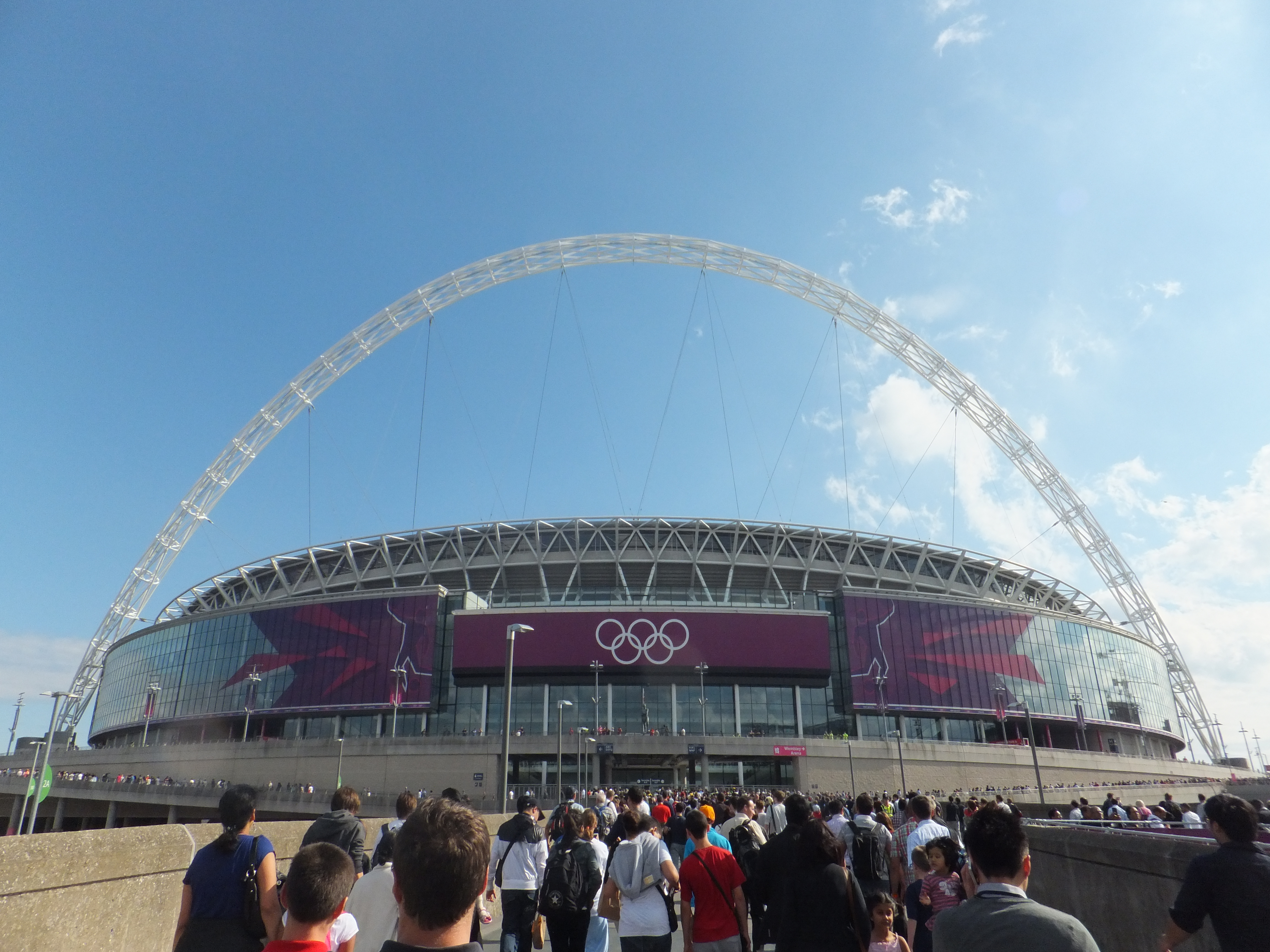
Wembley Stadium during the London 2012 Olympic Games football tournament

The new Wembley was a significant part of the plan for the 2012 Summer Olympics in London; the stadium was the site of several games in both the men's and women's football tournaments, with the finals being held there. The FA offices at Wembley Stadium, with social areas and boardroom, were designed by architects Gebler Tooth – who were also responsible for Team GB House at the London 2012 Olympics.

Additionally, the Rugby League Challenge Cup Final returned to Wembley Stadium in 2007, and the stadium also hosted both semi-finals of the 2013 Rugby League World Cup. Wembley was one of the 13 venues for the 2015 Rugby World Cup.

The Race of Champions staged their 2007 and 2008 events at the stadium.

Tottenham Hotspur agreed with the operators (Wembley National Stadium Ltd) to use the stadium for all of their European fixtures during the 2016–17 season, before using the stadium for the entire 2017–18 season. They also played most of their home games of the 2018–19 season at Wembley and continued until April 2019 when they moved to their new stadium.

=== Regular events ===
Wembley has a series of annual events that under normal circumstances are hosted at the stadium every year. These events cover the sports of football, rugby league and American football.

Event	Approximate dates
EFL Cup Final	Final Sunday of February
England football team home games of the March international break	Fourth Thursday to Tuesday of March
EFL Trophy Final	First Sunday of April
FA Cup semi-finals	Third weekend of April
Women's FA Cup Final	Second Sunday of May
FA Cup Final	Third Saturday of May
FA Trophy Final	Third Sunday of May (double header)
FA Vase Final	Third Sunday of May (double header)
National League and EFL playoff Finals	Mid/Late May
Year 7 School Boy's Final (rugby league)	First Saturday of June (quadruple header)
Women's Challenge Cup Final	First Saturday of June (quadruple header)
Challenge Cup Final	First Saturday of June (quadruple header)
1895 Cup Final	First Saturday of June (quadruple header)
FA Community Shield	Second Saturday of August (double header)
Women's FA Community Shield	Second Saturday of August (double header)
England football team home games of the September international break	First Thursday to Tuesday of September
England football team home games of the October international break	Second Thursday to Tuesday of October
NFL London Games	Late October
England football team home games of the November international break	Third Thursday to Tuesday of November

=== Football ===
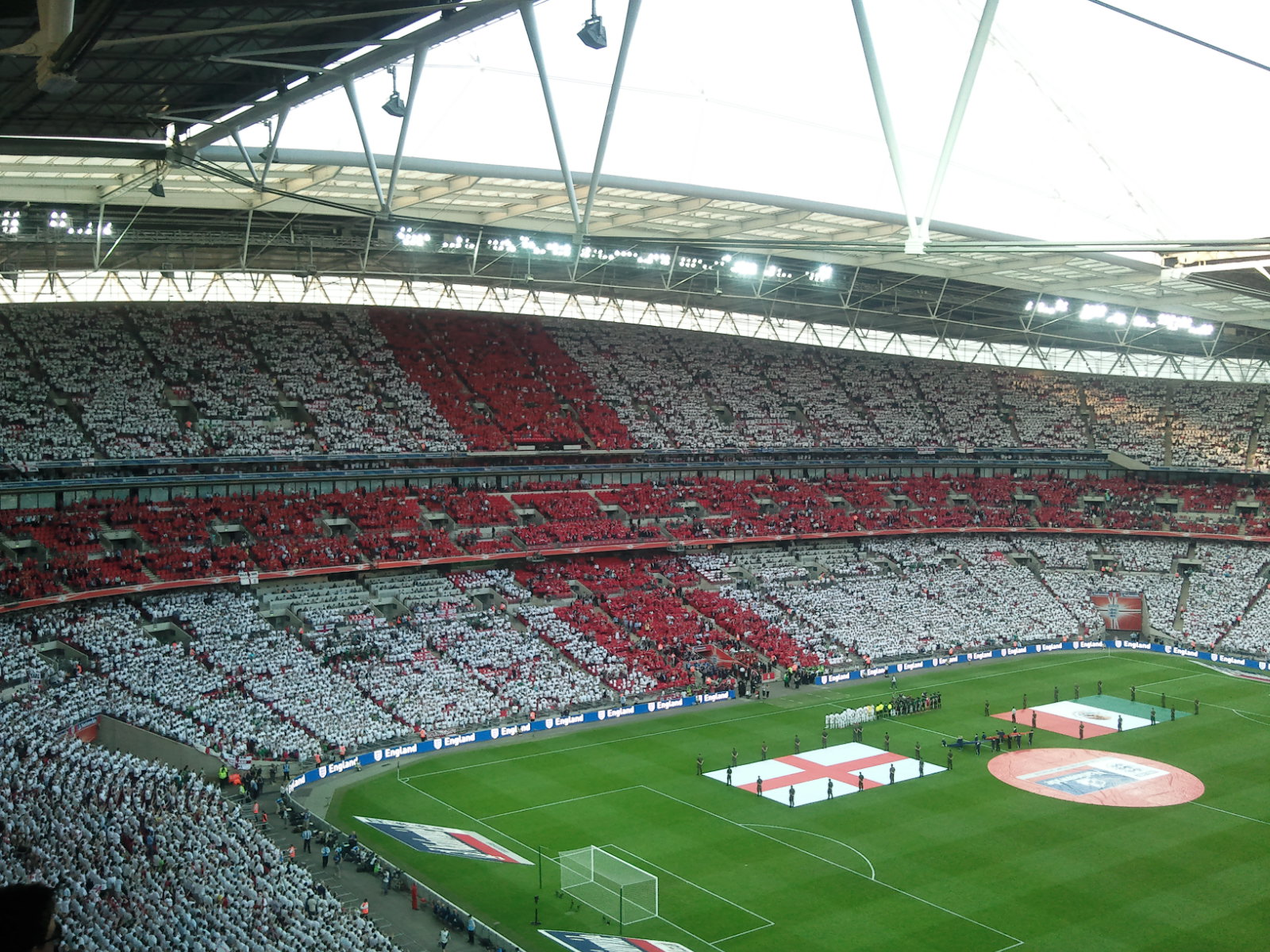
Fans of the England football team create the St George's Cross.

The first match at the stadium was a game played behind closed doors between Multiplex and Wembley Stadium staff. The first game in front of spectators was between the Geoff Thomas Foundation Charity XI and the Wembley Sponsors Allstars on 17 March 2007. The Geoff Thomas Foundation Charity XI won 2–0 (scorers Mark Bright and Simon Jordan). The first official match involving professional players was England U21s vs Italy U21s on 24 March 2007, which finished 3–3. Official attendance was 56,700 (although all of the 60,000 tickets that were made available were sold in advance). The first player to score in a FIFA-sanctioned match was Italian striker Giampaolo Pazzini after 28 seconds of the same game; he also scored the first hat-trick at Wembley. The first English player to score in a full-scale match was David Bentley with a free kick in the same game.

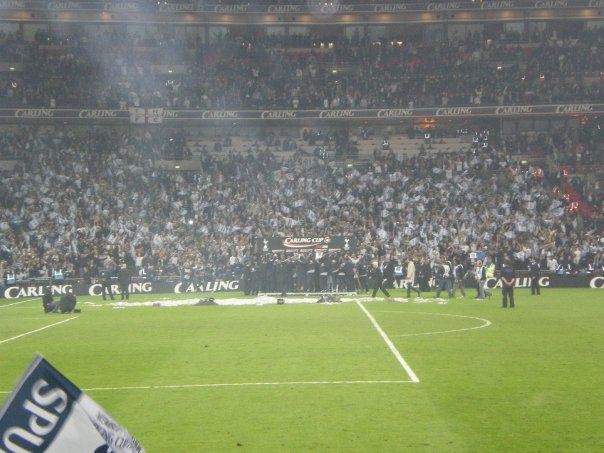
Tottenham Hotspur celebrate winning the Football League Cup against Chelsea in 2008.

The first club game, competitive game, and cup final held at the new Wembley took place on 12 May 2007 when Kidderminster Harriers met Stevenage Borough in the FA Trophy final. Kidderminster striker James Constable was the first player to score a goal in a final at the new Wembley. Kidderminster became the first team to play at both the old and new stadium. Stevenage Borough were the first team to win a final at the new Wembley beating Kidderminster 3–2, despite trailing 2–0 at half time. The first players to play at both the old and new Wembley Stadiums were Steve Guppy (for Stevenage Borough) and Jeff Kenna (for Kidderminster Harriers). Ex-England international Guppy is also the first player to win a final at both stadia (with Wycombe Wanderers and Leicester City in the old Wembley, then Stevenage Borough in the new one). Ronnie Henry is the first ever player to lift a competitive club trophy at the new Wembley.

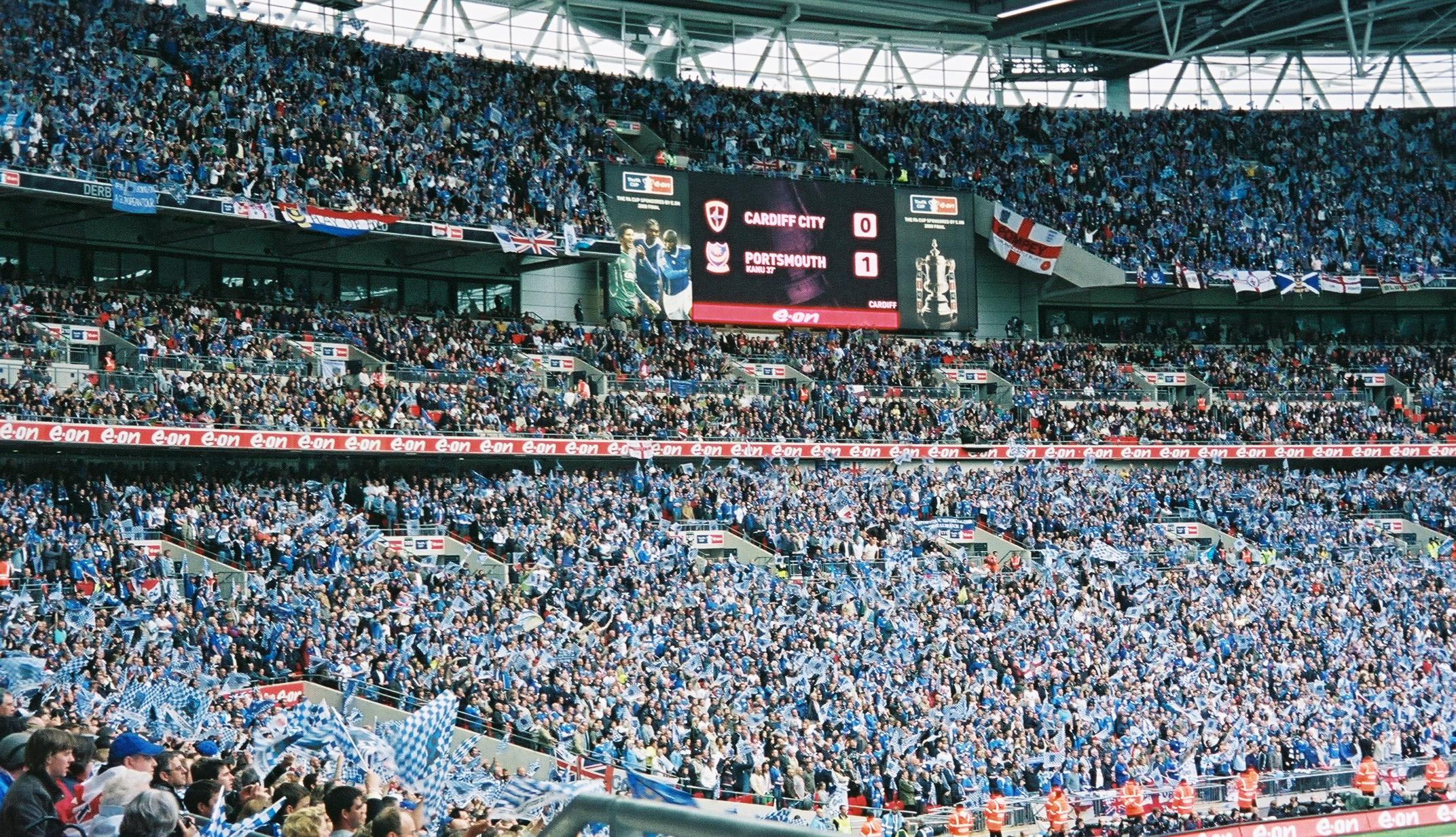
Portsmouth fans celebrate winning the FA Cup against Cardiff City in 2008. The 89,874 attendance is the largest football attendance in the new Wembley's history.

The first penalty save and first red card came in the Conference National playoff final between Exeter City and Morecambe. The penalty was saved by Paul Jones of Exeter City from Morecambe striker Wayne Curtis. The red card was given to Matthew Gill of Exeter for a headbutt on Craig Stanley of Morecambe.

The first Football League teams to play at Wembley in a competitive fixture were Bristol Rovers and Shrewsbury Town in the 2007 Football League Two play-off final on 26 May 2007. Shrewsbury Town became the first league team to score at Wembley via a Stewart Drummond goal, they also the first league team to have a player sent off, in this case – Marc Tierney. Bristol Rovers won the game 3–1 in front of 61,589 which was a stadium record until the Championship play-off final two days later when Derby County beat West Bromwich Albion 1–0 to become the first team at the new stadium to win promotion to the FA Premier League.

The first FA Cup Final at the new Wembley (between Manchester United and Chelsea) was on 19 May 2007, with a crowd attendance of 89,826. Chelsea won 1–0 with a goal by Didier Drogba, making him the first player to score in the FA Cup Final at the new Wembley – the first male player to score in four separate FA Cup Finals. Chelsea goalkeeper Petr Čech also became the first goalkeeper not to concede a goal in a competitive game at Wembley. Chelsea were the last winners of the cup final at the old Wembley and the first winners at the new.

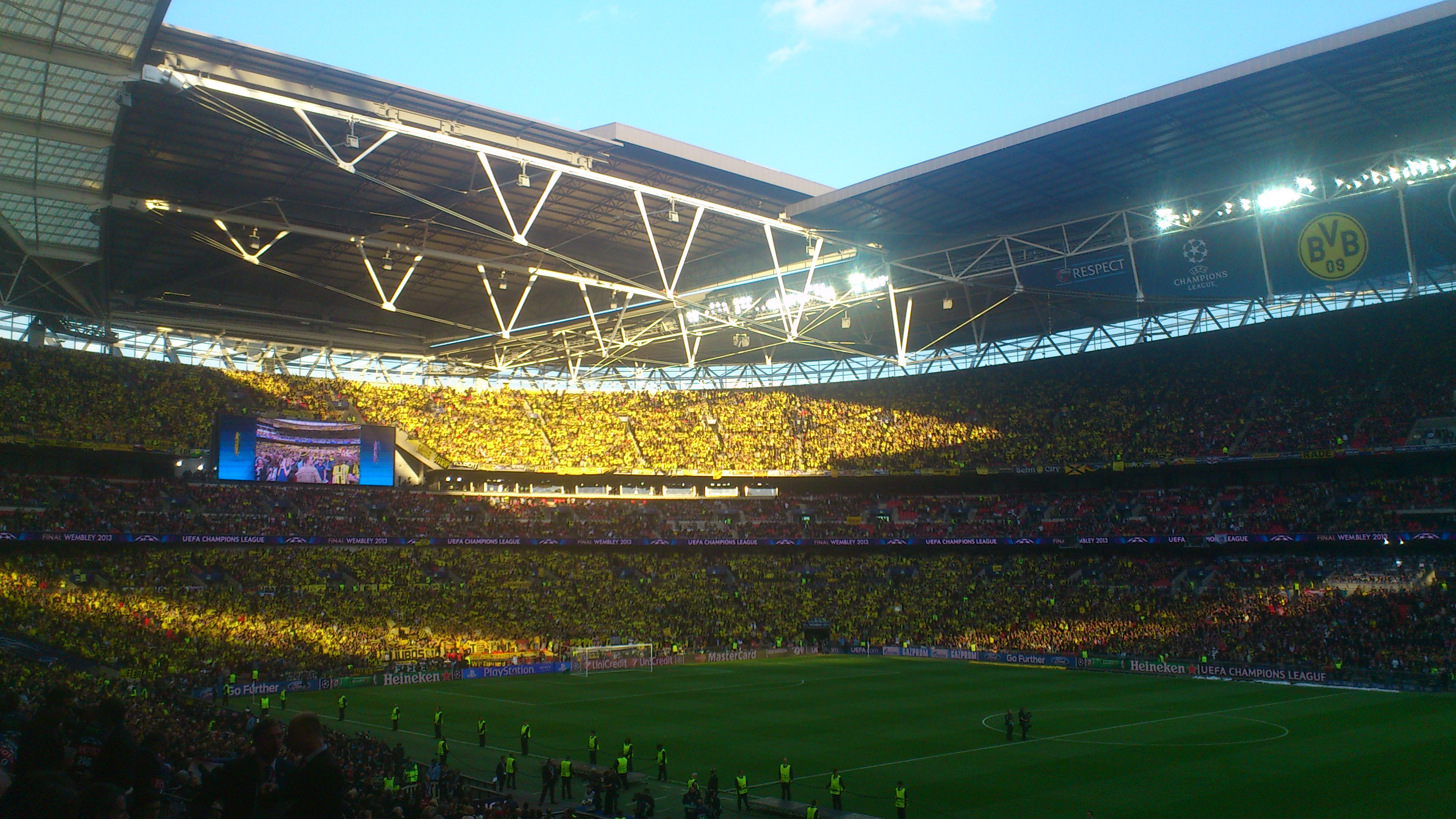
Wembley hosted the 2013 UEFA Champions League final between Bayern Munich and Borussia Dortmund.

The first game involving the full England national team was a friendly played on 1 June 2007, against Brazil. The match saw captain John Terry become the first England international goal scorer at the new stadium when he scored in the 68th minute. Diego became the first full international player to score for a visiting team when he scored in stoppage time, with the full-time result being a 1–1 draw. The first competitive senior international was played on 8 September 2007 between England and Israel. This game ended 3–0. The first player to score international goals at both the old and new stadia was Michael Owen when he scored for England against Israel. On 22 August, Germany beat England 2–1 to become the first team to beat them in the new stadium. England's first competitive defeat at the new stadium was on 21 November 2007 when Croatia won 3–2. This match cost England qualification to UEFA Euro 2008 and head coach Steve McClaren his job.

UEFA Champions League finals
Season	Winners	Score	Runners-up	Attendance
2010–11	Barcelona (Spain)	3–1	(England) Manchester United	87,695
2012–13	Bayern Munich (Germany)	2–1	(Germany) Borussia Dortmund	86,298
2023–24	Real Madrid (Spain)	2–0	(Germany) Borussia Dortmund	86,212

The second FA Cup final held at the new stadium took place on 17 May 2008, with Portsmouth winning the title 1–0 against Cardiff City; Nwankwo Kanu scored the only goal. The final's 89,874 crowd attendance remains the largest football attendance in the new Wembley's history.

Wembley hosted the UEFA Champions League final for the first time on 28 May 2011 when Barcelona played Manchester United. The stadium hosted the 2013 UEFA Champions League final between Bayern Munich and Borussia Dortmund, and in September 2019 it was named the host for the 2023 UEFA Champions League final. Due to adjustments of the 2020 final caused by the COVID-19 pandemic in Europe, it staged the following season's final between Borussia Dortmund and Real Madrid instead.

During the 2012 Olympics, Great Britain defeated Brazil in the first women's international to take place at the stadium. On 23 November 2014 the England women's team played at the stadium for the first time when they lost 3–0 to Germany in a friendly.

The stadium, with pandemic restrictions, hosted the UEFA Euro 2020, which included all three of England's Group D, two round of 16 matches, both semi-finals, and the final. On 29 June 2021, in the round of 16 match at the UEFA Euro 2020 tournament, England won 2–0 against Germany at Wembley, for the national team's first knockout victory against their international rivals Germany at a major international football tournament, since the 1966 World Cup final at the original Wembley Stadium. On 7 July 2021, in the semi-final match at the UEFA Euro 2020 tournament, England won 2–1 against Denmark at Wembley, for the national team's first European Championship final ever, with Italy winning the final on Sunday 11 July 2021 against England. The stadium was also used to host the UEFA Women's Euro 2022, albeit reserved only for the final on 31 July 2022, where England also reached the final, won the game against Germany 2–1 to bring England first ever major European honour. The final was watched by a crowd of 87,192, a record for either the men's or women's European Championship. The stadium will also host matches during UEFA Euro 2028.

=== Rugby league ===
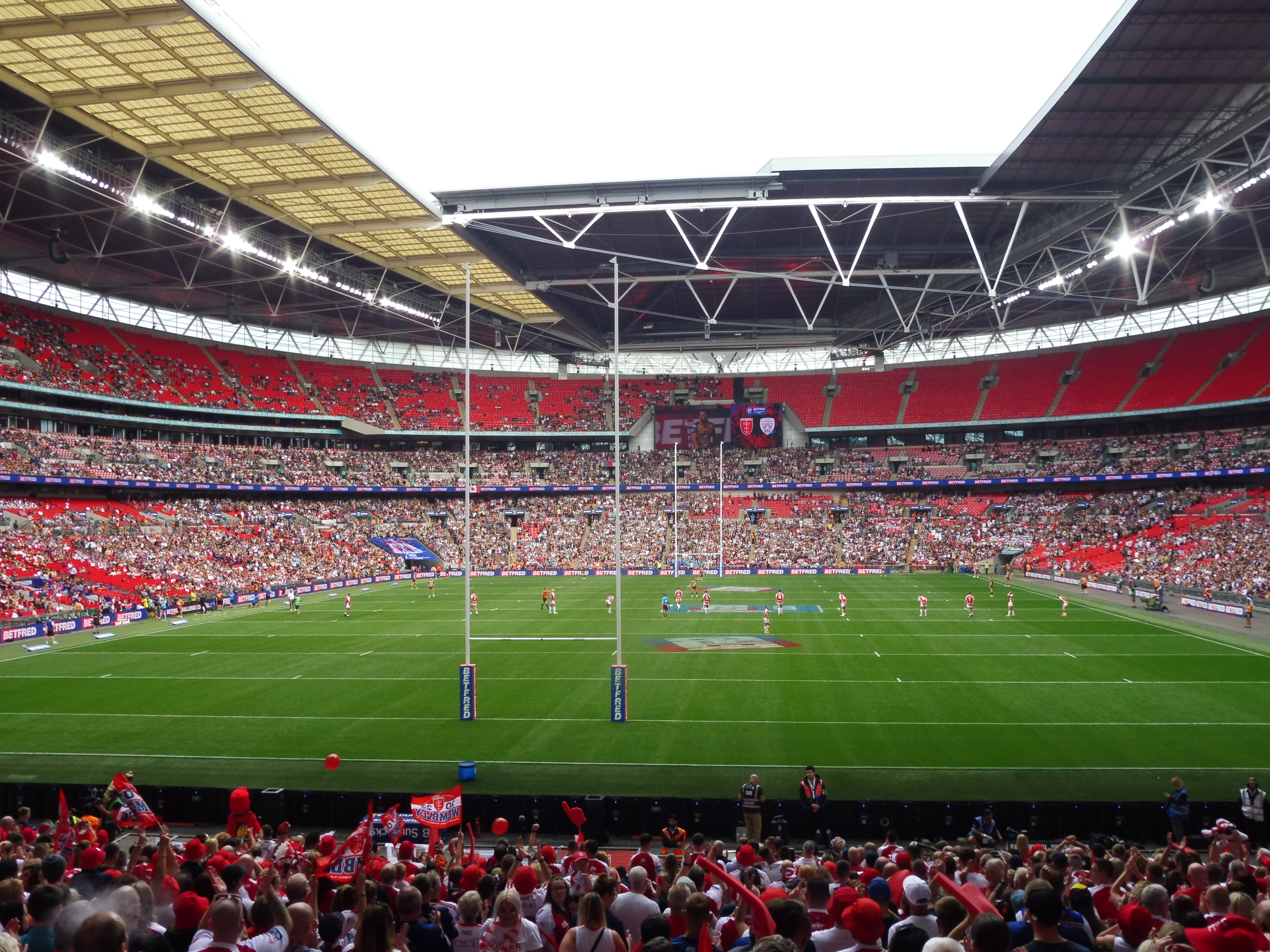
Leigh and Hull KR contested the 2023 Challenge Cup final.

The rugby league Challenge Cup Final had been played annually at the old Wembley Stadium since 1929. In 2007, the cup final returned to its traditional home after the rebuilding of Wembley. When Catalans Dragons played St. Helens in the 2007 Challenge Cup final, they became the first non-English rugby league team to play in the final. The result saw St Helens retain the cup by a score of 30–8 before 84,241 fans. The first rugby league team to win a game at the new Wembley Stadium, were Normanton Freeston. The West Yorkshire secondary school beat Castleford High School in the Year 7 boys Carnegie Champion Schools final, which was played immediately prior to the 2007 Challenge Cup Final. The first official try at the renovated Wembley was scored by James Roby of St Helens, although Luke Metcalfe of Castleford High School scored the first try in the schools game that took place before the 2007 Challenge Cup final.

Castleford Academy (formerly Castleford High School) currently hold the record for the most rugby league appearances at the new Wembley Stadium. On 24 August 2013 their Year 7 Rugby team played RGS High Wycombe in the annual schools curtain-raiser to the Challenge Cup final. This was Castleford Academy's 4th appearance at the stadium since 2007. This puts them joint with Leeds and one appearance ahead of Warrington.

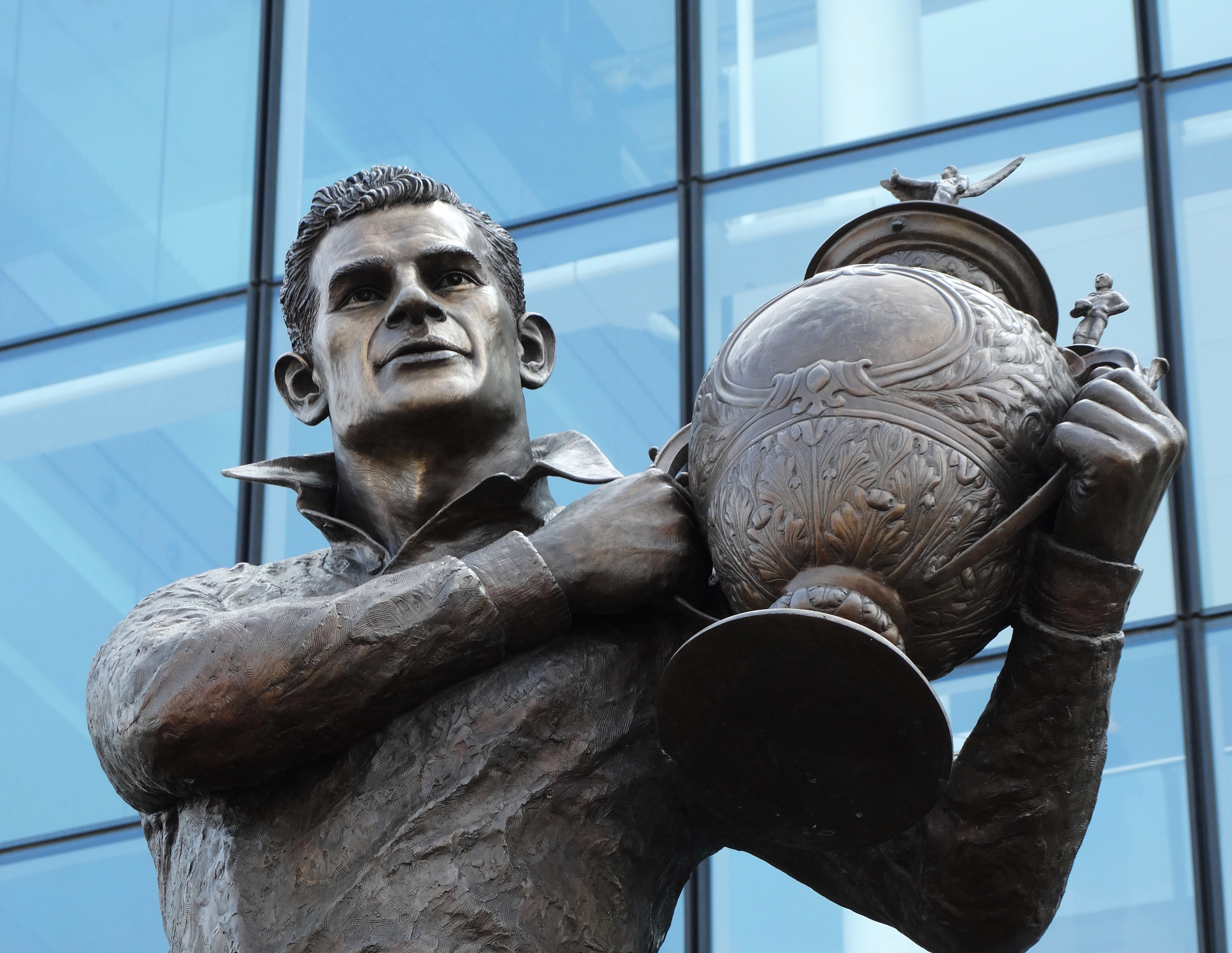
World Cup and three time Challenge Cup winner Eric Ashton centres a statue of five rugby league legends outside Wembley.

In 2015, a second statue was erected outside Wembley, depicting Rugby League legends Martin Offiah, Alex Murphy, Eric Ashton, Gus Risman and Billy Boston.

In 2011, international rugby league returned to Wembley for the first time since 1997 when Wales lost to New Zealand 0–36 and Australia beat host nation England 36–20 in the 2011 Rugby League Four Nations. The semi-finals of the 2013 Rugby League World Cup were played at Wembley Stadium where defending champions New Zealand beat England 20–18, and eventual tournament champions Australia defeated Fiji 64–0. The double header drew 67,575 fans to Wembley, the second highest crowd for an international rugby league game at either the original or the new stadium.

=== Rugby union ===
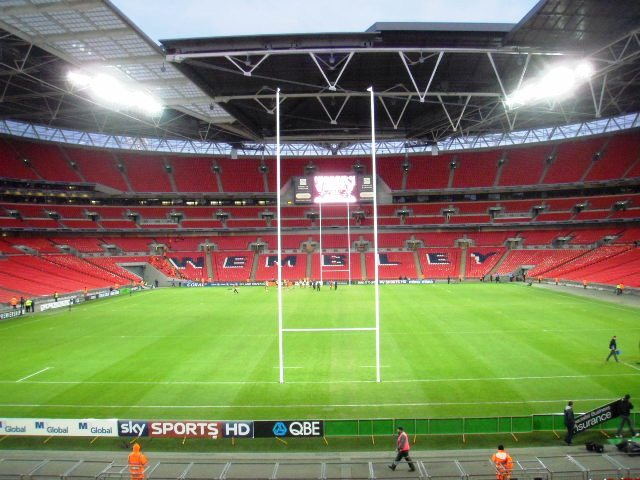
Wembley in rugby union formation, with posts up before Saracens played Worcester Warriors in 2010

The first top level rugby union match was a non-cap match between the Barbarians and Australia on 3 December 2008.

Between 2009 and 2017, the stadium was used regularly by Saracens for some major Aviva Premiership and Heineken Cup matches. Their Aviva Premiership clash with Harlequins in 2012 was played before a crowd of 83,761, a world record for a rugby union club match. The same two teams set further records of 83,889 spectators in 2014, and 84,068 in 2015.

The stadium was used during the 2015 Rugby World Cup, during which it hosted two pool matches. The 89,019 crowd for the New Zealand versus Argentina game set a new record attendance for a Rugby World Cup game. The Ireland versus Romania match one week later improved this record again to 89,267. Although the 90,000 seat Wembley was the largest stadium used during the 2015 Rugby World Cup, the World Cup Final was held at the 82,000 seat Twickenham Stadium, the traditional home of the tournament's host, England's Rugby Football Union.

=== American football ===
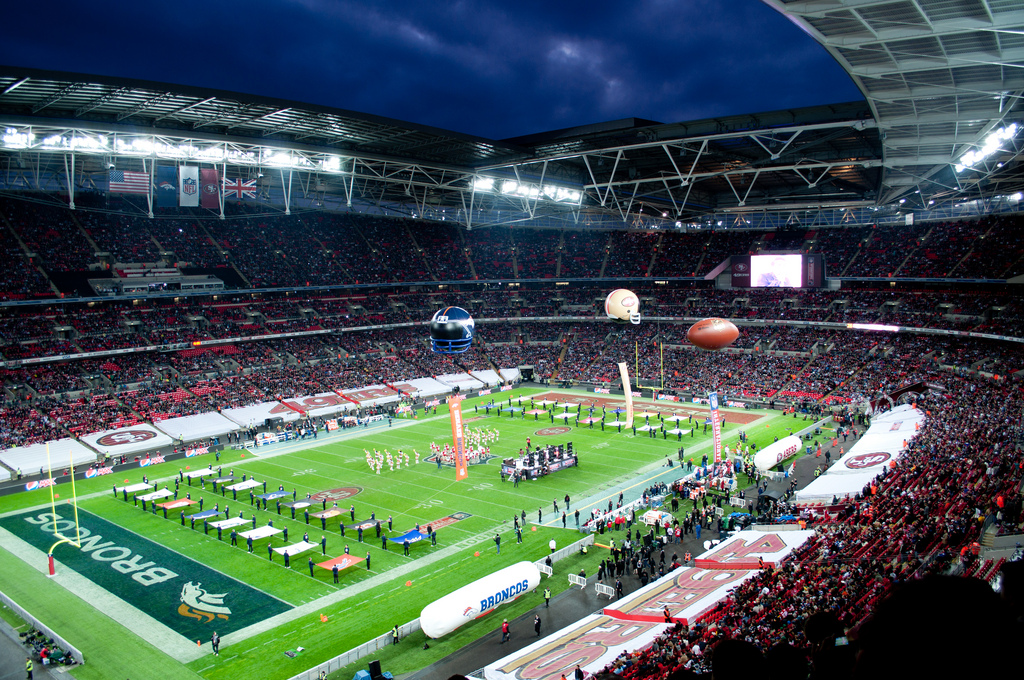
Build up to the 2010 game between Denver Broncos and San Francisco 49ers

Wembley has had a long association with American football. A United States Football League game was staged there in 1984, and between 1986 and 1993 the old Wembley Stadium hosted eight National Football League exhibition games featuring 13 different NFL teams. Between the opening of the new stadium in 2007 and 2019, Wembley hosted games during the NFL regular season. As a result of this, NFL commissioner Roger Goodell stated in October 2009 that "he expected the NFL will start playing multiple regular-season games in Britain in the next few years, an expansion that could lead to putting a franchise in London."

On 28 October 2007, in front of 81,176 fans, the New York Giants defeated the Miami Dolphins by a score of 13–10 in the first NFL regular season game ever to be played in Europe, and the first outside of North America. The first touchdown scored at Wembley was on a run by Giants' quarterback Eli Manning.

On 20 January 2012, the league announced that the St. Louis Rams would become a temporary tenant of Wembley, playing an annual game at the stadium every year from 2012 to 2014; part of the reason the Rams were chosen was that the team is owned by Stan Kroenke, who also is majority shareholder in a local Premier League team, Arsenal. However, the Rams later cancelled their 2013–2014 games, leading to the Jacksonville Jaguars becoming new temporary tenants and agreeing to host games in London from 2013 to 2016.

On 16 October 2012, the NFL announced there were to be two NFL regular season games played at Wembley during the 2013 season. The Pittsburgh Steelers at Minnesota Vikings on 29 September 2013, and the San Francisco 49ers at Jacksonville Jaguars on 27 October 2013. This is an attempt by the NFL to strengthen the NFL fanbase in London and internationally. Future plans to have a permanent NFL team in London have been suggested.

Another first was recorded in 2014 as three regular season NFL games were played at Wembley. The Oakland Raiders hosted the Miami Dolphins on 28 September at 6 pm BST, the Atlanta Falcons hosted the Detroit Lions on 26 October at 1:30 pm GMT and the Jacksonville Jaguars hosted the Dallas Cowboys on 9 November at 6 pm GMT. At 9:30 am ET, the Detroit-Atlanta game was the earliest kick off in NFL history and gave fans a unique four game window on this day. In 2015, another first occurred as the first ever divisional match took place at Wembley between the American Football Conference – Eastern Division's Miami Dolphins and New York Jets.

On 30 October 2016, for the first time in an NFL game played outside the US, the game carried into overtime and subsequently ended in a tie (another first for both Wembley and a London Game) in a week 8 match between the Washington Redskins and the Cincinnati Bengals. The final score was 27–27.

The Jaguars' deal was extended to 2020 and they were to become the first team to host two games in London in 2020. The two Jacksonville Jaguars games which were scheduled to be played in autumn 2020, were cancelled in May 2020 meaning that the Jaguars played consecutive annual games at Wembley only until 2019. A new agreement was reached in 2022 which would see Jacksonville continue to host annual games for three years until 2024. The game between the Jaguars and the New England Patriots on 20 October 2024 saw a record crowd for an NFL game at Wembley, with 86,651 in attendance.

Wembley Stadium hosted its first college football game in 2026 between Arizona State and Kansas. The contest, as part of the new Union Jack Classic series, was the first college football match played in Britain since 1988.

=== Boxing ===
On 31 May 2014, Wembley Stadium hosted its first boxing event, featuring the rematch between Carl Froch and George Groves for the WBA and IBF super-middleweight titles. The contest was held in front of a crowd of 80,000, a British post-war attendance record for a boxing event, surpassing the crowd at the City of Manchester Stadium when it hosted Ricky Hatton vs. Juan Lazcano in May 2008.

The WBA (Super) and IBF heavyweight championship fight, Anthony Joshua vs. Wladimir Klitschko, broke the attendance record on 29 April 2017, with an attendance of approximately 90,000.

In 2018, Joshua returned to Wembley and defeated Alexander Povetkin for the WBA (Super), IBF and WBO heavyweight titles in front of 80,000.

The WBC and The Ring heavyweight title fight, Tyson Fury vs. Dillian Whyte, took place on 23 April 2022 in a sold-out Wembley Stadium with 94,000. Fury emerged victorious with a 6th-round TKO.

The stadium hosted Anthony Joshua vs Daniel Dubois on 21 September 2024 as part of the Riyadh Season with Dubois emerging victorious by knockout in front of 85,644.

Oleksandr Usyk vs. Daniel Dubois heavyweight boxing rematch for the Undisputed Championship was held on 19 July 2025 at the stadium. Usyk emerged victorious by knockout in front of 90,000.

=== Professional wrestling ===
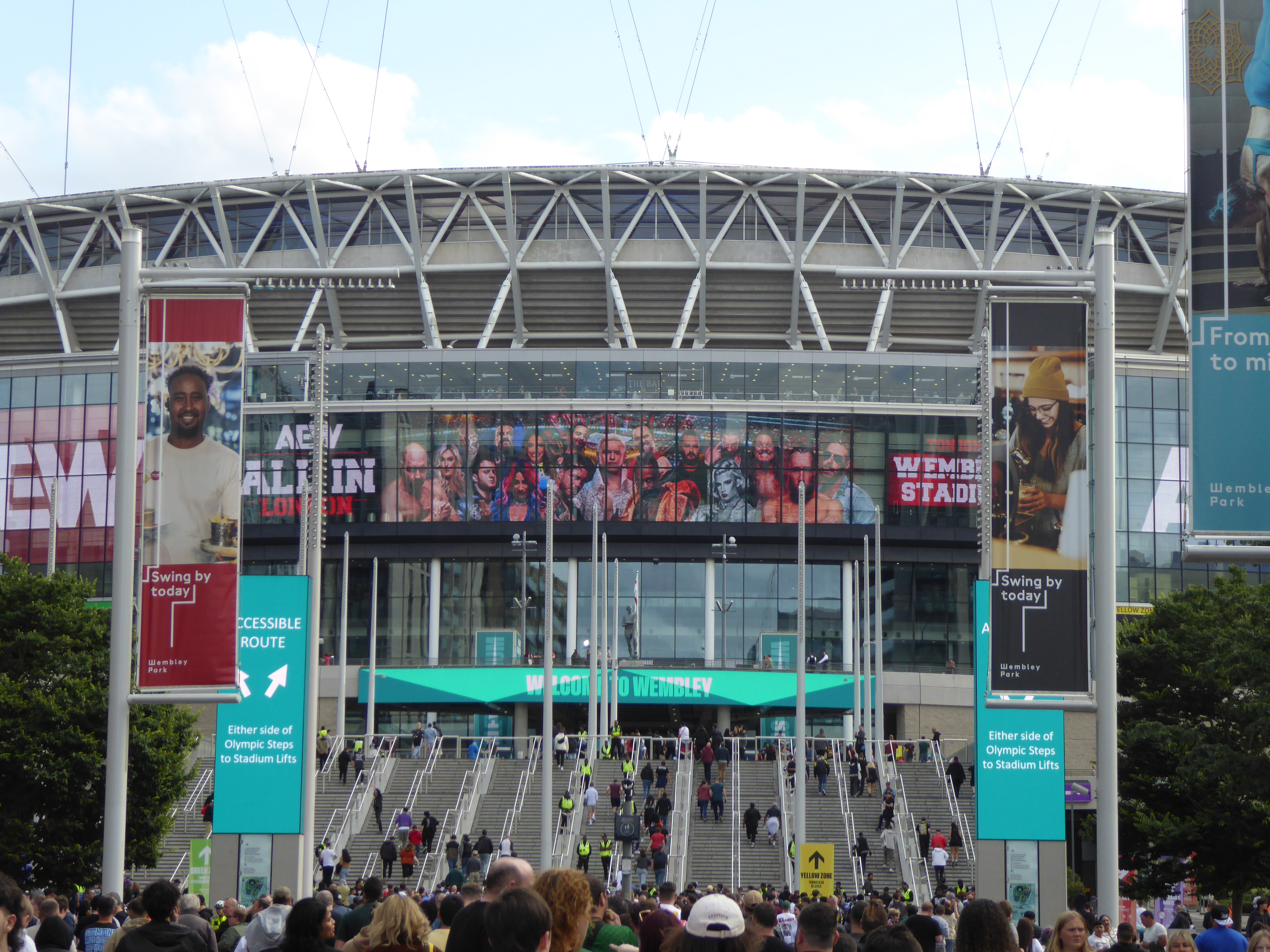
The exterior of Wembley Stadium during All In (2024)

On 5 April 2023, Tony Khan, president of American professional wrestling promotion All Elite Wrestling (AEW), announced that they would stage an event at the stadium on 27 August 2023, promoted as "All In London at Wembley Stadium". It would be the promotion's debut in the United Kingdom, as well as their first event held outside of North America, and the first professional wrestling event overall to be held at the modern Wembley Stadium; WWE's SummerSlam was held at the original Wembley in 1992. Wembley hosted All In on 25 August 2024, where Bryan Danielson won the AEW World Championship in the main event. AEW returned to Wembley for All In on 30 August 2026.

== Music ==
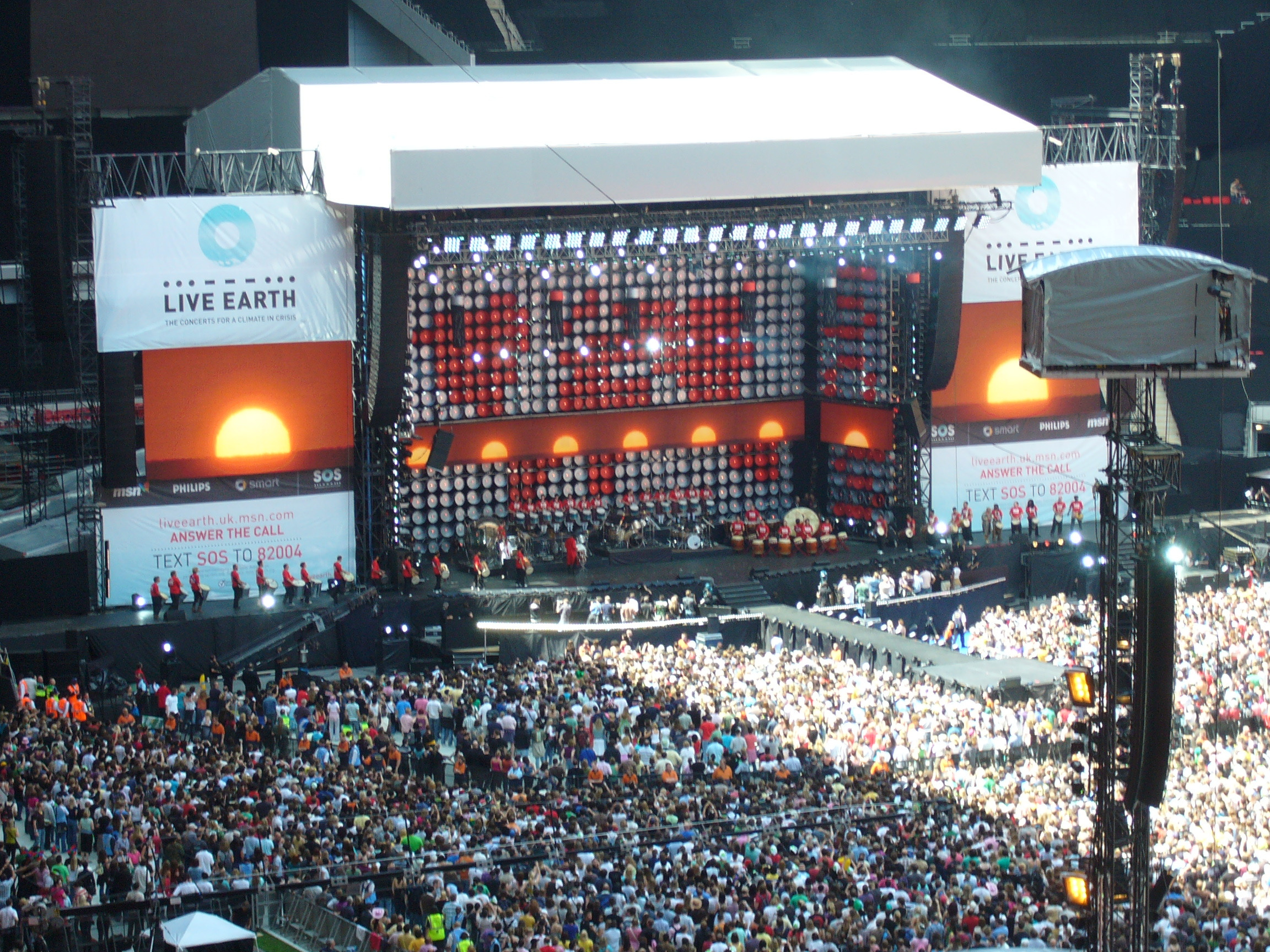
The stage at the Live Earth concert held at Wembley on 7 July 2007

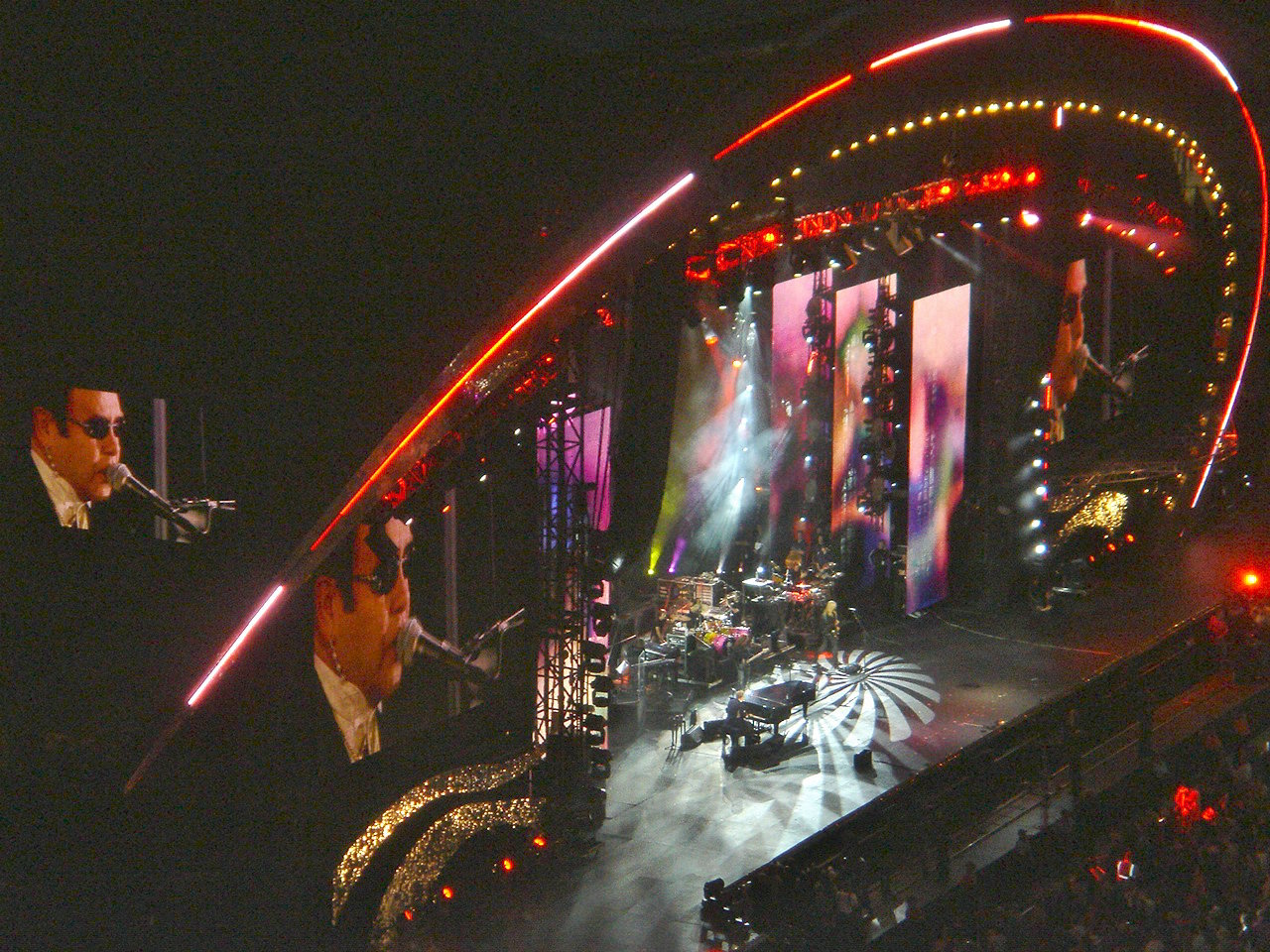
Elton John on piano at the Concert for Diana at Wembley on 1 July 2007, commemorating Diana, Princess of Wales

Besides football, Wembley can be configured to hold other events, particularly major concerts. This was designed at the outset in order to provide funding for the construction of the new stadium.

The first concert at the new stadium was given by George Michael on 9 June 2007. Bon Jovi, the last act to perform at the original Wembley, were scheduled to be the first artists to perform at the new Wembley but the late completion of the stadium saw the concerts relocated to the National Bowl and the KC Stadium. Muse became the first band to sell out the new stadium on 16 and 17 June 2007, and released a live DVD of the performance. Other acts to have performed at the stadium are The Stone Roses, Beyoncé, Adele, Rihanna, Ed Sheeran, The Weeknd, Mötley Crüe, Metallica, U2, The Killers, Linkin Park, Green Day, the Foo Fighters, Coldplay, Eminem, Madonna, Taylor Swift, Jeff Lynne's ELO, the Spice Girls, Harry Styles, Oasis, Take That, BTS, One Direction, AC/DC and Guns N' Roses. Wembley hosted Take That Present: The Circus Live for four nights in summer 2009.

In the first week of July 2007, two large charity concerts were held at the new Wembley Stadium, the Concert for Diana, a memorial concert to commemorate ten years since the death of Diana, Princess of Wales and celebrating what would have been her 46th birthday, and Live Earth, a concert hosted at Wembley as part of the Live Earth Foundation, committed to combatting climate change.

Rock band Foo Fighters performed at the stadium in two sold-out shows in June 2008 and were captured on the DVD Live at Wembley Stadium. U2 continued their 360° tour at Wembley on 14 and 15 August 2009 in front of 164,244 fans.

95.8 Capital FM's Summertime Ball, which was previously hosted with 55,000 spectators at the Arsenal Emirates Stadium and slightly fewer in Hyde Park (as Party in the Park), was hosted at Wembley Stadium on 6 June 2010, and was headlined by Rihanna and Usher. The move to Wembley allowed many more fans to watch the annual music event which has previously lasted over 5 hours with more than 15 performers. It has since returned to the Stadium every year since, usually in early June. Rock band Green Day continued their world tour, playing at Wembley on 19 June 2010. The gig was Green Day's biggest audience yet with over 90,000.

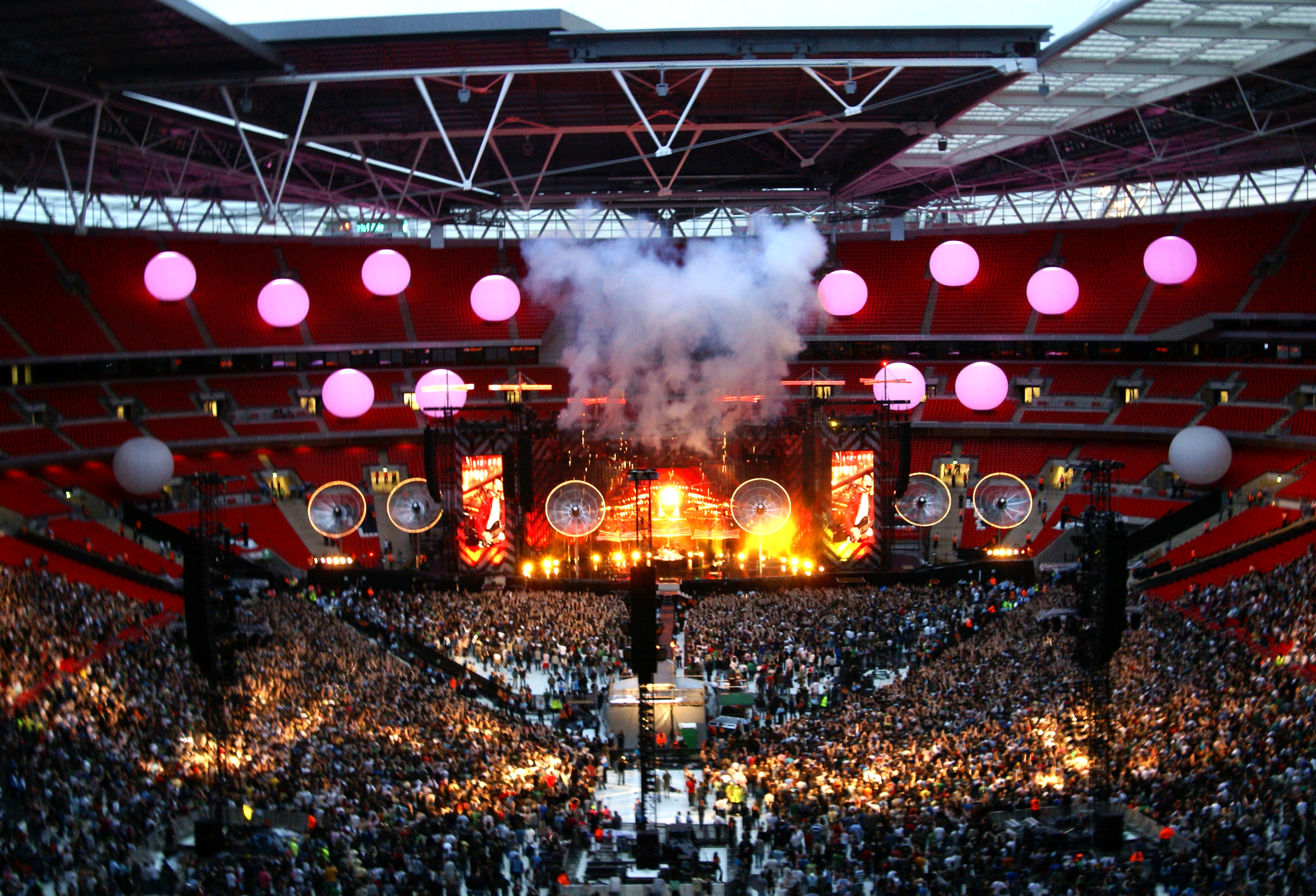
Muse at Wembley, June 2007

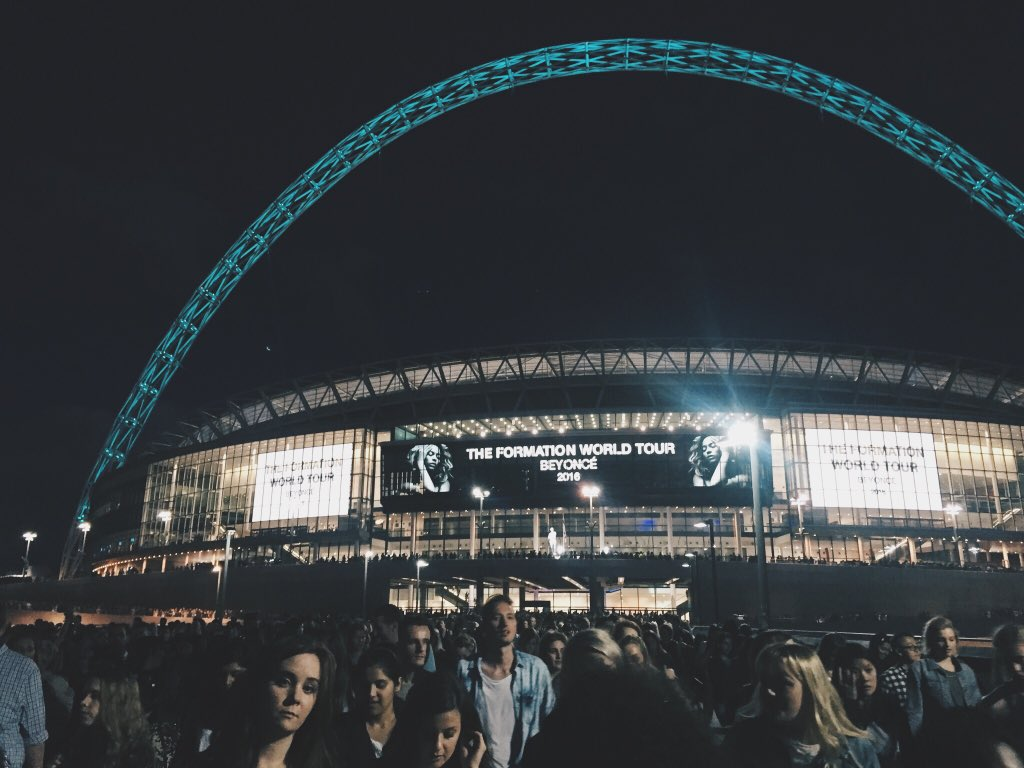
The exterior of Wembley following a Beyoncé concert in 2016

Muse returned to Wembley Stadium on 10 and 11 September 2010 as part of their Resistance Tour to a sell-out crowd, having previously played there in June 2007. Madonna played Wembley in 2008 during her Sticky and Sweet Tour, to a sold-out audience of 74,000. The event has surpassed all gross revenue for a single concert at Wembley, grossing nearly US$12 million. Take That played a record-breaking eight nights at Wembley in the summer of 2011 on their Progress Live tour, which has become the fastest and biggest selling tour in UK history.

The Olympics meant that no concerts took place at Wembley in summer 2012, with other big shows taking place elsewhere. In summer 2013, there were seven big shows. The first act to perform at the venue was Bruce Springsteen, who played his first show at the new stadium on 15 June. One week later, rock band The Killers performed their biggest headlining show ever at the venue, and performed a new song specially written for the show entitled "Wembley Song", with frontman Brandon Flowers introducing the song by announcing: "We've written a song for this joyous occasion." The song included references to band's that performed at Wembley in the past, the original stadium's iconic twin towers, and multiple lyrical references to the Killers' popular songs. Robbie Williams then performed four solo concerts at the stadium on 29 and 30 June, and on 2 and 5 July after previously performing with Take That at the stadium in 2011. The summer's final show saw former Pink Floyd bass guitarist Roger Waters play at the venue on 14 September as part of The Wall Live tour. In 2014, One Direction played to 246,000 people over three sold-out shows at Wembley on 6–8 June as part of their Where We Are Tour. The following year, on 10–12 July 2015, Ed Sheeran performed three sold-out shows at the venue as part of his world tour. The concert was documented and aired on 16 August 2015 on NBC; the one-hour special Ed Sheeran – Live at Wembley Stadium also included behind-the-scenes footage. Beyoncé performed two sold-out shows on her Formation World Tour.

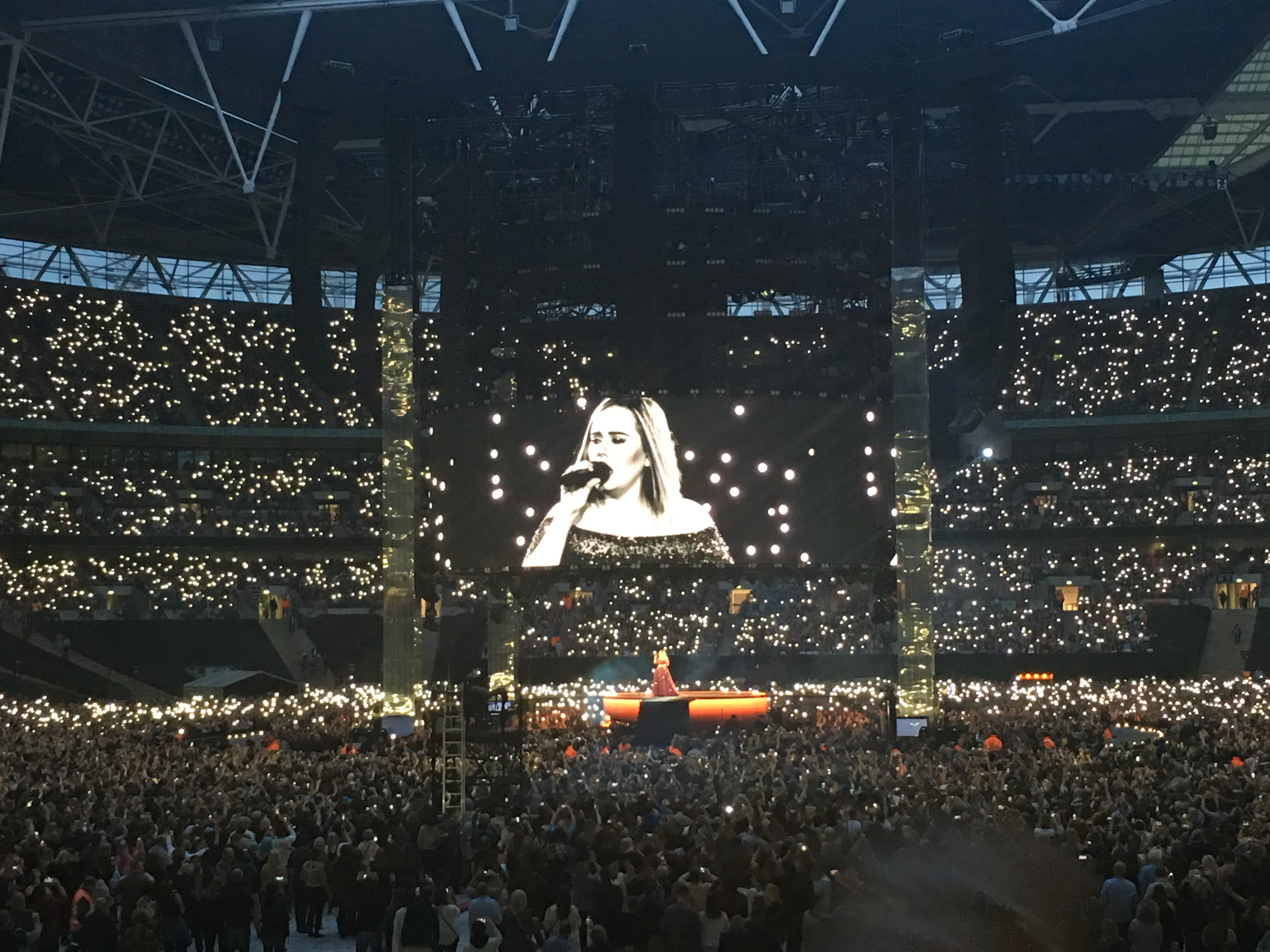
Adele at Wembley in June 2017. Adele's concert on 28 June was attended by 98,000 fans, a stadium record for a UK music event.

Adele completed her world tour with two concerts, dubbed "The Finale", at Wembley on 28 and 29 June 2017. The 28 June concert was attended by 98,000 fans, a stadium record for a UK music event. It was originally scheduled to conclude on 2 July 2017, however on 30 June Adele announced via social media that she had regretfully cancelled her final two performances upon medical advice due to vocal injuries. American singer-songwriter Taylor Swift performed two sold-out shows at the stadium on 22 and 23 June 2018. The shows were attended by over 143,000 people and were the last shows for the European leg of her Reputation Stadium Tour.

On 1 and 2 June 2019, BTS became the first K-pop group to headline and sell out at Wembley, by selling out two dates for their Love Yourself: Speak Yourself tour. In June 2019, the Spice Girls performed the last three sold out dates of their Spice World – 2019 Tour. The three-night sellout stand was the highest-grossing engagement of the year, winning the Spice Girls the 2019 Billboard Live Music Award for Top Boxscore. June also saw two sold-out shows by Fleetwood Mac's new line-up. Later, on 6 July 2019, The Who performed in the stadium during their Moving On! Tour, 40 years since playing in the old stadium. In June 2022, Harry Styles, previously of One Direction, performed two sold out nights at the stadium as part of his solo world tour, Love on Tour, following a venue change from The O2 Arena due to high demand. The COVID-19 pandemic had forced the original tour planned for 2020 to be postponed. Four further Love on Tour shows were played in 2023. On 6 August 2022, after two years of postponement because of the COVID-19 pandemic restrictions, Irish pop band Westlife performed for the first time at the stadium with a recorded screenplay at ITV on 20 November 2022. On 3 September 2022, the Foo Fighters played in a sold out Wembley to pay tribute to their late drummer Taylor Hawkins, with guest appearances from Liam Gallagher, Queen, Brian Johnson, Lars Ulrich, Them Crooked Vultures, Paul McCartney and many others.

Blur headlined two shows at Wembley on 8 and 9 July 2023 as part of their reunion tour.

The Weeknd brought his After Hours til Dawn Tour on 18 August 2023, which broke the record for the most tickets sold with the "traditional concert set-up", having 89,179 people.

Taylor Swift's return for The Eras Tour on 21, 22, and 23 June 2024 and 15, 16, 17, 19, and 20 August 2024 made her the first female act in the stadium's history to schedule six, seven and eight shows on a single tour, and subsequently broke Michael Jackson's record for most nights at either stadium on the site by a solo performer.

On 27 August 2024, Liam Gallagher and Noel Gallagher announced that Oasis would be reuniting in 2025, with Wembley making up the second venue in England with seven scheduled concerts on 25, 26, 30 July, 2, 3 August and 27, 28 September 2025. The band previously performed at Wembley in 2009, their last tour prior to 2025.

In November 2024, nu-metal band Linkin Park announced that they would be performing at Wembley on their world tour on 28 June 2025 with tickets sold out.

Dua Lipa headlined two sold-out shows at Wembley on 20 and 21 June 2025 during the European leg of her Radical Optimism Tour.

Blackpink performed at Wembley as the final stop of the European leg of their Deadline World Tour on 15 and 16 August 2025.

British rock band Coldplay hold the record for most performances at Wembley, with 22 shows. The first two were on the Viva la Vida Tour in 2009, followed by a four-night stint on the Head Full of Dreams Tour in 2016. They became the first act to stage ten concerts in a single year, as part of the Music of the Spheres World Tour between August and September 2025. This residency was preceded by six dates in August 2022, making the tour's 16 gigs another record.

As of 28 January 2026, singer Harry Styles' brand new tour "Together, Together" has surpassed Coldplay's 10 concerts in a single year, with a total 12 concerts confirmed for summer 2026 announced during this tour's presale.

In 2026, country singer Luke Combs played three sold-out nights on 31 July and 1 and 2 August for his My Kinda Saturday Night Tour. Combs was the first country solo artist to headline Wembley and the first artist of his genre to sell out multiple nights there.

In August 2026, The Weeknd performed over three nights at the stadium during the 2026 extension of his After Hours til Dawn Tour, breaking records in attendance.

On 12 September 2026, Diljit Dosanjh became the first Punjabi artist to headline Wembley during his Aura World Tour. The concert was attended by an estimate of between 90,000 and 92,000 people.

== Transport connections ==
The stadium is described as a "public transport destination" for which parking is available on a very limited basis. To alleviate the impact of vehicular traffic on the local residents and businesses, Brent Council have introduced a number of measures in relation to on street parking and to access restrictions of roads that surround the stadium. The "Wembley Stadium Protective Parking Scheme" sets a boundary in which parking on street is restricted to only those that hold an event day parking permit. Road closures are in force from 10:00 am on the event day until midnight and apply to Fulton Road, Engineers Way and South Way.

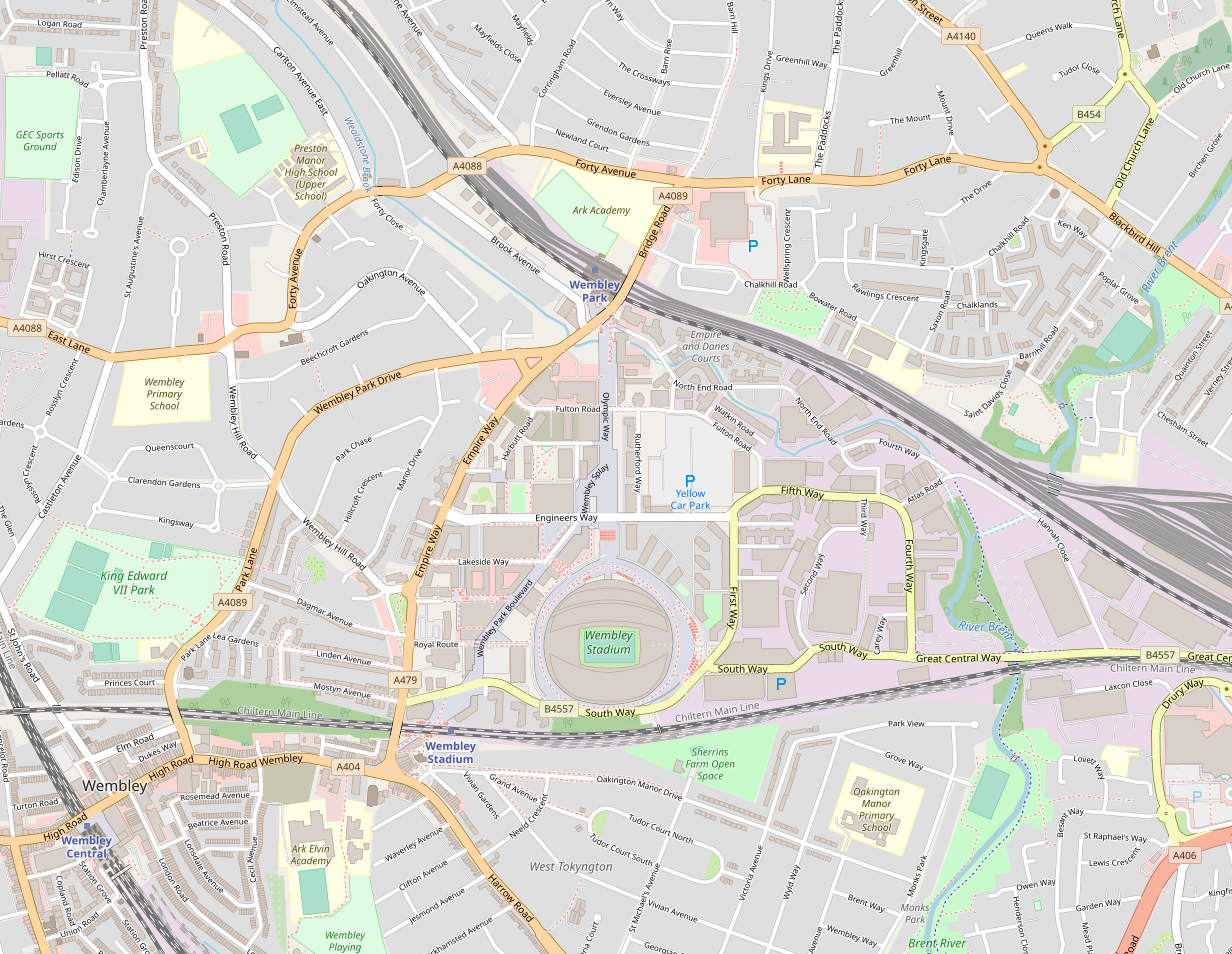
A map of Wembley Stadium in relation to Olympic Way, Wembley Central, Wembley Stadium and Wembley Park stations, and the A406 North Circular Road (bottom right)

=== Rail and Underground ===
The stadium is connected to two London Underground stations: Wembley Park Station (on the Metropolitan and Jubilee lines) via Olympic Way, and Wembley Central (Bakerloo line) via the White Horse Bridge. Rail links are provided at Wembley Central (London Overground, Southern and London Northwestern Railway services) and Wembley Stadium railway station (Chiltern Railways services).

Stations near by:

Service	Station	Lines
London Underground	Wembley Park	Jubilee line Metropolitan line
London Underground	Wembley Central	Bakerloo line
London Overground	Wembley Central	Lioness line
National Rail	Wembley Central	Southern; London Northwestern Railway
National Rail	Wembley Stadium	Chiltern Railways

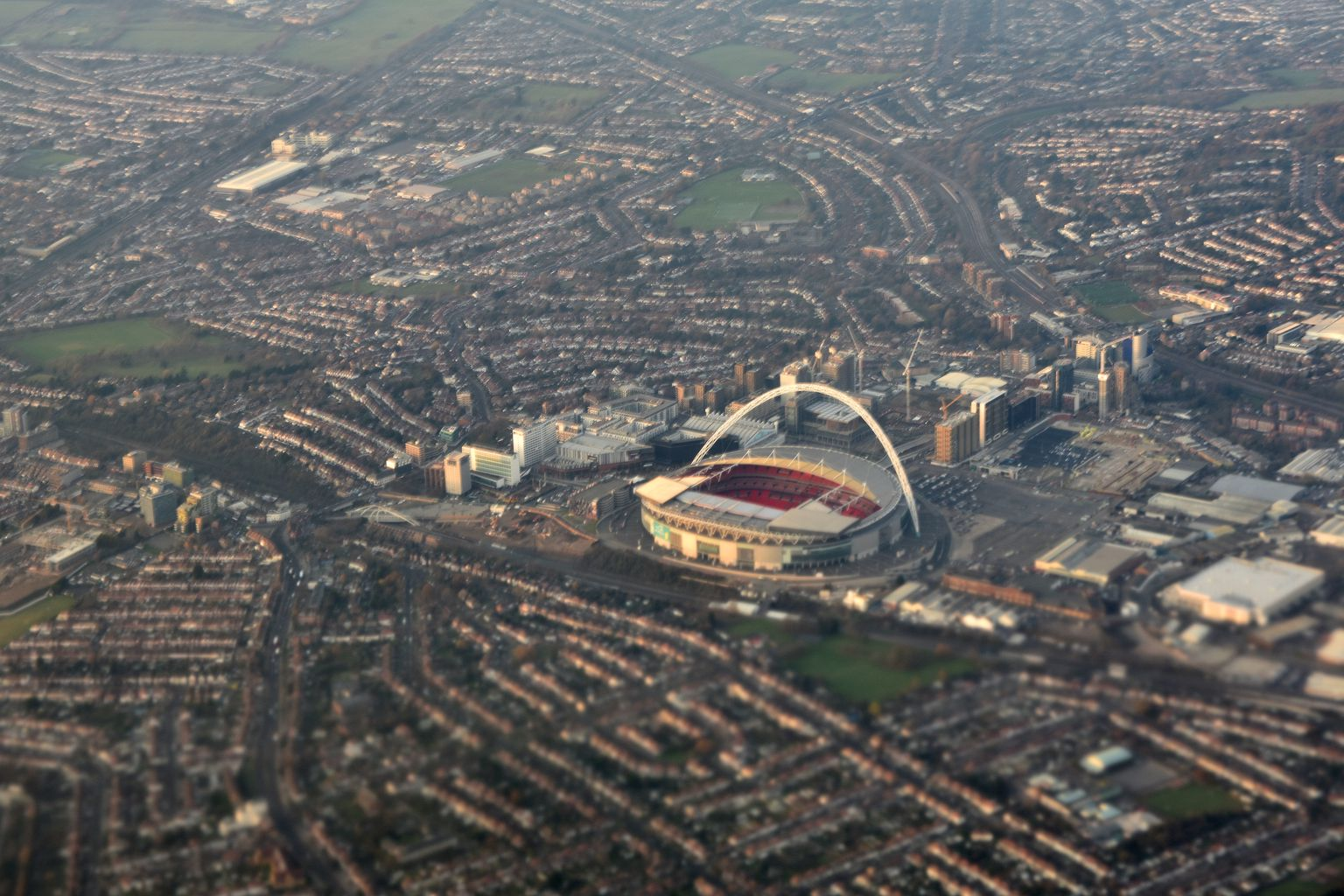
Aerial view of Wembley Stadium and its surroundings in 2016

=== Onsite parking ===
The onsite parking facility is shared with Wembley Arena, essentially being the open air surface parking surrounding the eastern flank of Wembley Stadium and the multi-storey car park. These are called Green Car Park and Red Car Park, respectively. There is disabled parking available onsite, at the Green Car Park, at a reduced rate but on a first come first served basis. On some football event dates, opposing team supporters have been separated into the two different car parks.

=== Bus ===
London bus routes near by:

Route	Start	End	Operator
18	Euston	Sudbury	London United
83	Golders Green	Alperton	Metroline
92	St Raphael's North	Ealing Hospital	Metroline
182	Brent Cross	Harrow Weald, Oxhey Lane	Metroline
206	Kilburn Park	Wembley Park, The Paddocks	Metroline
223	Wembley Central	Harrow	London United
297	Willesden Bus Garage	Ealing Broadway	Metroline
440	Turnham Green Church	Wembley First Way	London United
483	Harrow	Windmill Park, Three Bridges	Metroline
N83	Golders Green	Ealing Hospital	Metroline

== See also ==
- List of football stadiums in England
- List of British stadiums by capacity
- List of European stadiums by capacity
- Lists of stadiums

Events
Preceded by Millennium Stadium; Cardiff	FA Cup; Final venue 2007–present	Succeeded by Incumbent
Preceded by Santiago Bernabéu Stadium; Madrid	UEFA Champions League; Final venue 2011	Succeeded by Allianz Arena; Munich
Preceded by Beijing National Stadium (men); Workers' Stadium (women); Beijing	Summer Olympics; Football gold medal matches venue 2012	Succeeded by Estádio do Maracanã; Rio de Janeiro
Preceded by Allianz Arena; Munich	UEFA Champions League; Final venue 2013	Succeeded by Estádio da Luz; Lisbon
Preceded by Stade de France; Saint-Denis	UEFA European Championship; Final venue 2020	Succeeded by Olympiastadion; Berlin
Preceded by Grolsch Veste; Enschede	UEFA European Women's Championship; Final venue 2022	Succeeded by St. Jakob-Park; Basel
Preceded by Atatürk Olympic Stadium; Istanbul	UEFA Champions League; Final venue 2024	Succeeded by Allianz Arena; Munich
