= HMS Attack =

Three ships and a shore establishment of the Royal Navy have borne the name HMS Attack:

Ships

- HMS Attack (1794) was a 12-gun Conquest-class gun-brig launched in 1794 and sold in 1802.
- HMS Attack (1804) was an Archer-class gun-brig launched in 1804 and captured by Danish gunboats off Anholt in 1812.
- HMS Attack (1911) was an Acheron-class destroyer launched in 1911 and sunk in 1917.

Shore establishments

- HMS Attack (shore establishment) was a Coastal Forces base at Portland, commissioned in 1941 and paid off in 1945.

== See also ==
- HMS Attacker
- HMAS Attack
