= Incursion =

Incursion may refer:

- an invasion
- Incursion (game), a 1992 roleplaying game
- Incursion (comics), a Marvel Comics concept from the 2015–16 storyline "Secret Wars"
  - Incursion (Marvel Cinematic Universe), a Marvel Cinematic Universe concept
- "Incursion (Part 1)" and "Incursion (Part 2)", Stargate Universe episodes
- Runway incursion, an aviation incident
- Ultimate Spider-Man: Incursion, a 2025 comic book

== See also ==
- Excursion (disambiguation)
- Attack (disambiguation)
