= HMAS Aitape =

Papua New Guinea Defence Force vessel

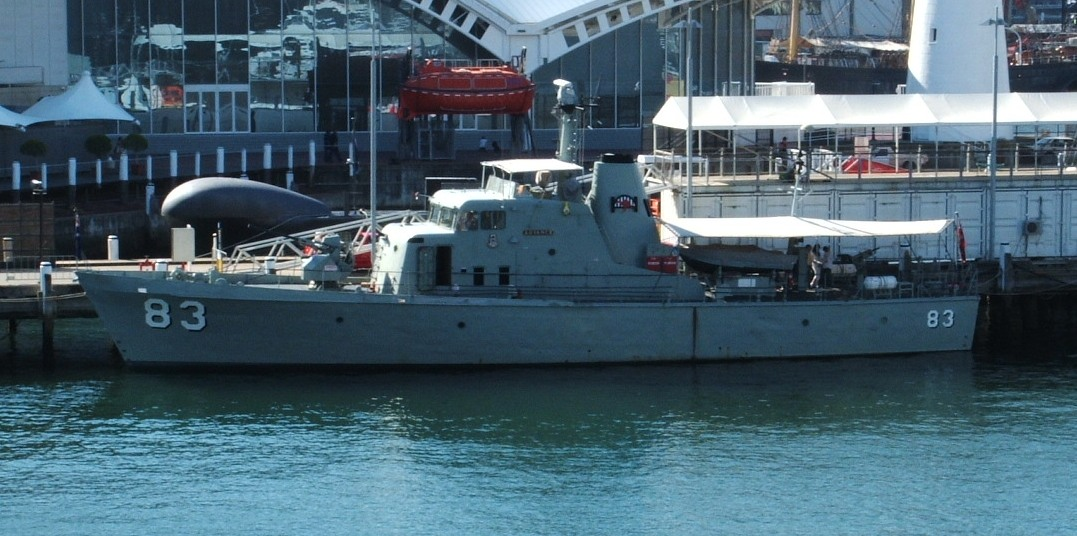
- HMAS Advance, a sister ship to Aitape

History

Australia
- Namesake: Town of Aitape, Papua New Guinea
- Builder: Walkers Limited
- Launched: 6 July 1967
- Commissioned: 13 November 1967
- Decommissioned: 14 November 1974
- Motto: "Tread Warily"
- Fate: Transferred to Papua New Guinea
- Badge

Papua New Guinea
- Commissioned: 14 November 1974
- Decommissioned: 1982
- Fate: Sunk as dive wreck 1995

General characteristics
- Class & type: Attack-class patrol boat
- Displacement: 100 tons standard; 146 tons full load
- Length: 107.6 ft (32.8 m) length overall
- Beam: 20 ft (6.1 m)
- Draught: 6.4 ft (2.0 m) at standard load; 7.3 ft (2.2 m) at full load
- Propulsion: 2 × 16-cylinder Paxman YJCM diesel engines; 3,460 shp (2,580 kW); 2 shafts
- Speed: 24 knots (44 km/h; 28 mph)
- Range: 1,200 nmi (2,200 km; 1,400 mi) at 13 knots (24 km/h; 15 mph)
- Complement: 3 officers, 16 sailors
- Armament: 1 × Bofors 40 mm gun; 2 × .50-calibre M2 Browning machine guns; Small arms

HMAS Aitape (P 84) was an Attack-class patrol boat of the Royal Australian Navy (RAN). It was named for the small town of Aitape, Sandaun Province, Papua New Guinea. Completed in 1967, the vessel was one of five assigned to the RAN's Papua New Guinea (PNG) Division. The patrol boat was transferred to the Papua New Guinea Defence Force in 1974 as HMPNGS Aitape. She remained active until 1982, when she was removed from service for use as a parts hulk. Aitape was scuttled off Port Moresby for use as a dive wreck in 1995.

== Design and construction ==
The Attack class was ordered in 1964 to operate in Australian waters as patrol boats (based on lessons learned through using the Ton-class minesweepers on patrols of Borneo during the Indonesia-Malaysia Confrontation), and to replace a variety of old patrol, search-and-rescue, and general-purpose craft. Initially, fourteen were ordered for the RAN, five of which were intended for the Papua New Guinea Division of the RAN, although another six ships were ordered to bring the class to twenty vessels.

The patrol boats had a displacement of 100 tons at standard load and 146 tons at full load, were 107.6 feet (32.8 m) in length overall, had a beam of 20 feet (6.1 m), and draughts of 6.4 feet (2.0 m) at standard load, and 7.3 feet (2.2 m) at full load. Propulsion machinery consisted of two 16-cylinder Paxman YJCM diesel engines, which supplied 3,460 shaft horsepower (2,580 kW) to the two propellers. The vessels could achieve a top speed of 24 knots (44 km/h; 28 mph), and had a range of 1,200 nautical miles (2,200 km; 1,400 mi) at 13 knots (24 km/h; 15 mph). The ship's company consisted of three officers and sixteen sailors. Main armament was a bow-mounted Bofors 40 mm gun, supplemented by two .50-calibre M2 Browning machine guns and various small arms. The ships were designed with as many commercial components as possible: the Attacks were to operate in remote regions of Australia and New Guinea, and a town's hardware store would be more accessible than home base in a mechanical emergency.

Aitape was laid down by Walkers Limited at Maryborough, Queensland, launched on 6 July 1967 by Mrs. Paliau Maloat, the wife of the a Manus leader and politician, and commissioned on 13 November 1967, four days before lead ship HMAS Attack.

== Operational history ==
Aitape undertook sea trials with sister ship Attack off Sydney, before heading for Papua New Guinea and arriving at the RAN base HMAS Tarangau at Los Negros Island, Manus Province on 3 January 1968. Primary roles of the new patrol boats were fisheries protection and sea training, but also undertook search and rescue, medical evacuation and monitoring of navigational aids roles. The ship's company was made up of both Australian and PNG servicemen. Prior to the arrival of the Attack-class patrol boats, surveillance of PNG waters was conducted by small coastal craft and occasional visits by larger RAN warships, but the PNG Division was now able to chase and apprehend vessels suspected of illegal fishing.

Aitape was one of the five Attack-class patrol boats of the RAN PNG Division transferred to the Papua New Guinea Defence Force's (PNGDF) Maritime Element on 14 November 1974 when the PNGDF took over maritime functions from the RAN. They formed the PNGDF Patrol Boat Squadron based at Manus. She served until 1982, when she was paid off to act as a source of spares for the other Attack-class patrol boats in PNGDF service. In 1995, she was sunk in shallow waters as dive wreck south east of Port Moresby.
