= Atack =

Atack (/ˈeɪtæk/ AY-tak) is a surname. Notable people with the surname include:

- Emily Atack (born 1989), British actress, comedian, impressionist, and television presenter
- Jeremy Atack (born 1949), American economic historian
- Lee Atack (born 1951), American soccer player
