= HMS Attacker =

Three ships of the Royal Navy have borne the name HMS Attacker:

- HMS Attacker (D02) was a Bogue-class escort carrier launched in 1941. Transferred to the Royal Navy under Lend-Lease in 1942, returned in 1946. Twice sold for civilian use but did not trade. Following conversion started at New York and finished at Genoa, served 1958–1977 as the passenger liner Fairsky and was broken up in 1980.
- HMS Attacker (1944) was an LST launched in 1944 as LST 3010. She was renamed HMS Attacker in 1947, transferred to the Ministry of War Transport in 1954 and renamed Empire Cymric. She was broken up in 1963.
- HMS Attacker (P281) was an Attacker-class patrol boat launched in 1983. She was sold to Lebanon in 1992 and renamed Trablous.
