= HMAS Attack =

Ship of the Royal Australian Navy

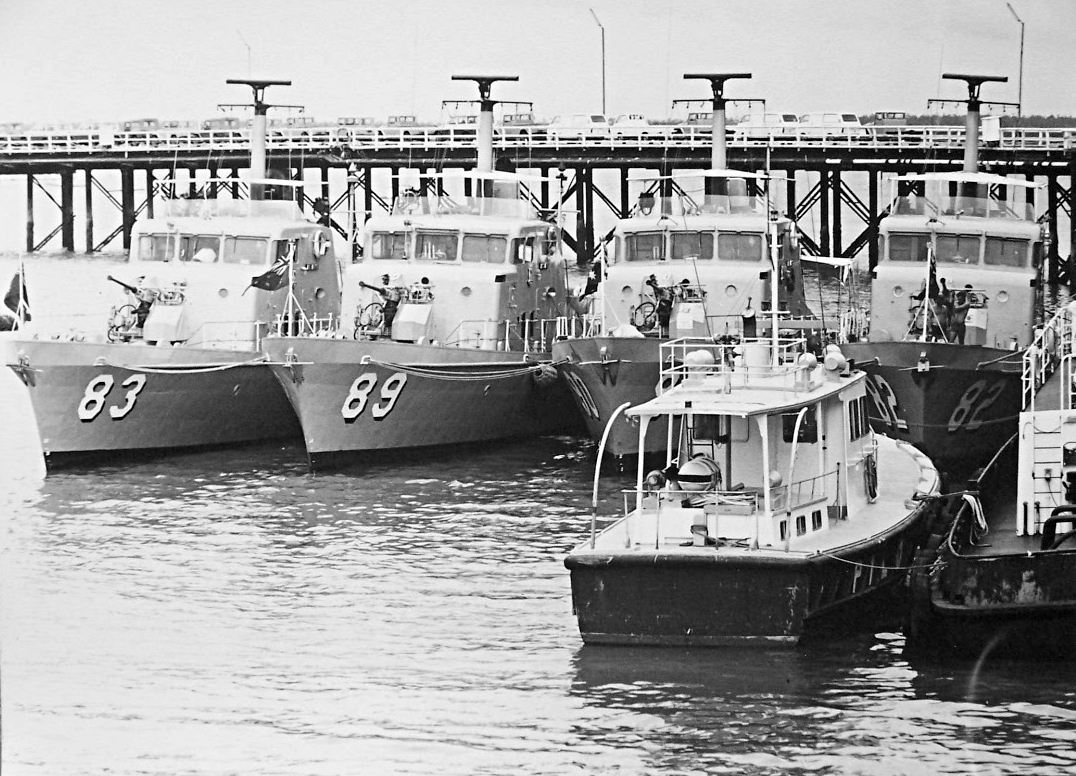
- HMAS Attack (second from right) with three other Attack-class patrol boats

History

Australia
- Builder: Evans Deakin and Company
- Launched: 8 April 1967
- Commissioned: 17 November 1967
- Decommissioned: 21 February 1985
- Motto: "Never Waver"
- Fate: Sold to Indonesia
- Badge

Indonesia
- Name: Sikuda
- Acquired: 24 May 1985
- Status: Active as of 2011

General characteristics
- Class & type: Attack-class patrol boat
- Displacement: 100 tons standard; 146 tons full load
- Length: 107.6 ft (32.8 m) length overall
- Beam: 20 ft (6.1 m)
- Draught: 6.4 ft (2.0 m) at standard load; 7.3 ft (2.2 m) at full load
- Propulsion: 2 × 16-cylinder Paxman YJCM diesel engines; 3,460 shp (2,580 kW); 2 shafts
- Speed: 24 knots (44 km/h; 28 mph)
- Range: 1,200 nmi (2,200 km; 1,400 mi) at 13 knots (24 km/h; 15 mph)
- Complement: 3 officers, 16 sailors
- Armament: 1 × Bofors 40 mm L/60 QF Mark VII gun; 2 × .50-calibre M2 Browning machine guns; Small arms

HMAS Attack (P 90) was the lead ship of the Attack-class patrol boats used by the Royal Australian Navy (RAN). Launched in April 1967 and commissioned in November that year, the ship was largely commercial in design and was used to protect fisheries in Australia's northern waters, and to support the survey ship Moresby. The vessel remained in RAN service until 1985 when it was transferred to the Indonesian Navy and renamed Sikuda.

== Design and construction ==
The Attack class was ordered in 1964 to operate in Australian waters as patrol boats based on lessons learned through using the Ton-class minesweepers on patrols of Borneo during the Indonesia-Malaysia Confrontation, and to replace a variety of old patrol, search-and-rescue, and general-purpose craft. Initially, nine were ordered for the RAN, with another five for Papua New Guinea's Australian-run coastal security force, although another six ships were later ordered to bring the class to twenty vessels.

The patrol boats had a displacement of 100 tons at standard load and 146 tons at full load, were 107.6 feet (32.8 m) in length overall, had a beam of 20 feet (6.1 m), and draughts of 6.4 feet (2.0 m) at standard load, and 7.3 feet (2.2 m) at full load. The vessels' propulsion machinery consisted of two 16-cylinder Paxman YJCM diesel engines, which supplied 3,460 shaft horsepower (2,580 kW) to the two propellers, producing a top speed of 24 knots (44 km/h; 28 mph) and a range of 1,200 nautical miles (2,200 km; 1,400 mi) at 13 knots (24 km/h; 15 mph). The ship's company consisted of three officers and sixteen sailors. Its main armament was a bow-mounted Bofors 40 mm gun, supplemented by two .50-calibre M2 Browning machine guns and various small arms. The ships were designed with as many commercial components as possible: the Attacks were to operate in remote regions of Australia and New Guinea, and a town's hardware store would be more accessible than home base in a mechanical emergency.

Attack was built by Evans Deakin and Company at Brisbane, Queensland, launched on 8 April 1967 and commissioned on 17 November 1967. Although it was the lead ship of the class, Attack was the second ship commissioned into the RAN, four days behind HMAS Aitape.

== Operational history ==
Following its commission, Attack served in the RAN for 17 years, during which time she was employed mainly in the waters to Australia's north, protecting fisheries. She was also used to support survey work conducted by Moresby. The patrol boat was in Darwin Harbour when Cyclone Tracy struck in the early hours of 25 December 1974. Unable to slip her moorings as conditions deteriorated, Attack attempted to use her engines to remain head-on to the storm. Dragging the cyclone buoy, the vessel was eventually washed aground on rocks close to Larrakeyah Barracks. She was refloated and towed to Cairns by HMAS Stuart and was repaired and returned to service.

Attack paid off on 21 February 1985. She was transferred to the Indonesian Navy on 24 May 1985 and renamed Sikuda.
