= Amphibious warfare ships of Australia =

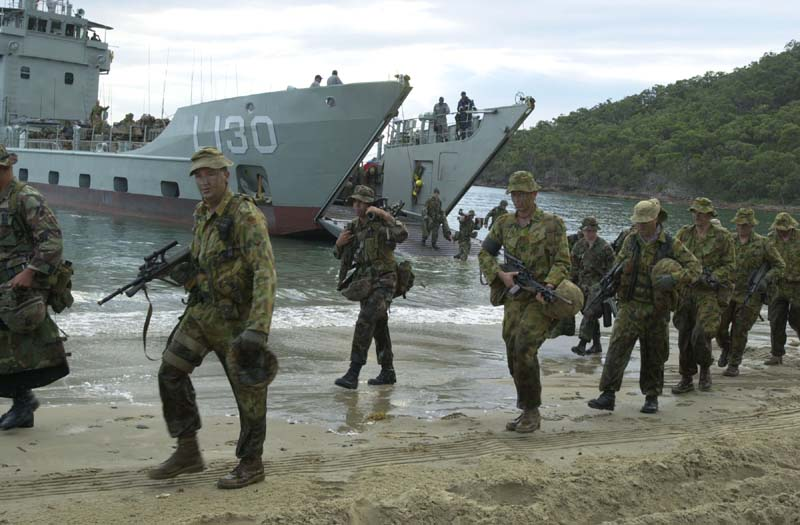
Australian and US soldiers disembark from HMAS Wewak during an exercise in 2001

The Royal Australian Navy and Australian Army have operated 29 amphibious warfare ships. These ships have been used to transport Army units and supplies during exercises and operational deployments.

== History ==
=== World War II ===
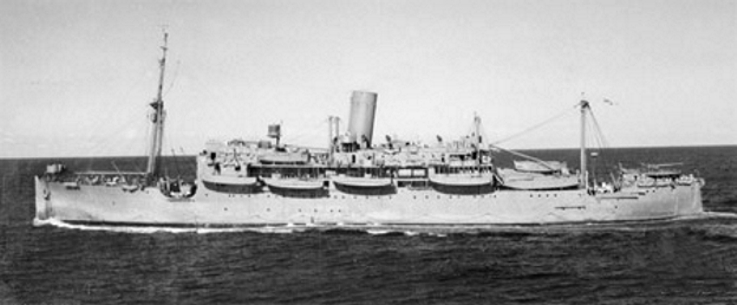
HMAS Westralia in 1944

The Australian military's first amphibious warfare ships were the three Landing Ships Infantry (LSI): HMAS Kanimbla, HMAS Manoora, and HMAS Westralia. These three ships had been built as civilian motor vessels and were converted to armed merchant cruisers at the outbreak of war in 1939. They were converted again to LSIs in 1943 and took part in United States and Australian amphibious assaults in the South West Pacific Area. The ships had a capacity of about 1,200 troops, which were landed from boats carried by the LSIs. Following the war, the three LSIs remained in service as transports until 1949 when they were returned to their owners.

=== Cold War ===
The RAN borrowed six Landing Ships Tank (LSTs) from the Royal Navy between 1946 and 1955. The LSTs were used as general purpose vessels and did not specialise in amphibious operations.

Australia was left without any amphibious combat ships after the LSTs were destroyed.. To rectify this situation the Army purchased four LSM-1-class Landing Ships Medium (LSMs) from the United States Navy (USN) in 1959. These ships were operated by the 32nd Small Ship Squadron, Royal Australian Engineers and supported Army exercises and operations. All four of the ships saw active service during the Vietnam War where they carried supplies between Australia and South Vietnam and between South Vietnamese ports. All four ships were decommissioned in September 1971 when the 32nd Small Ship Squadron was disbanded.

The LSMs were replaced by eight Balikpapan-class landing craft heavy which began to enter service in 1971. The first ship in the class, HMAS Balikpapan was briefly operated by the Army's Water Transport force but was later transferred to the Navy and all subsequent ships in the class were transferred to the Navy while they were under construction. These ships proved to be very successful and supported Australian Army exercises and operations throughout South East Asia. Two ships, HMAS Buna and HMAS Salamaua, were transferred to the Papua New Guinea Defence Force in 1974. Three of the remaining craft were decommissioned in December 2012, with the remainder decommissioned in November 2014.

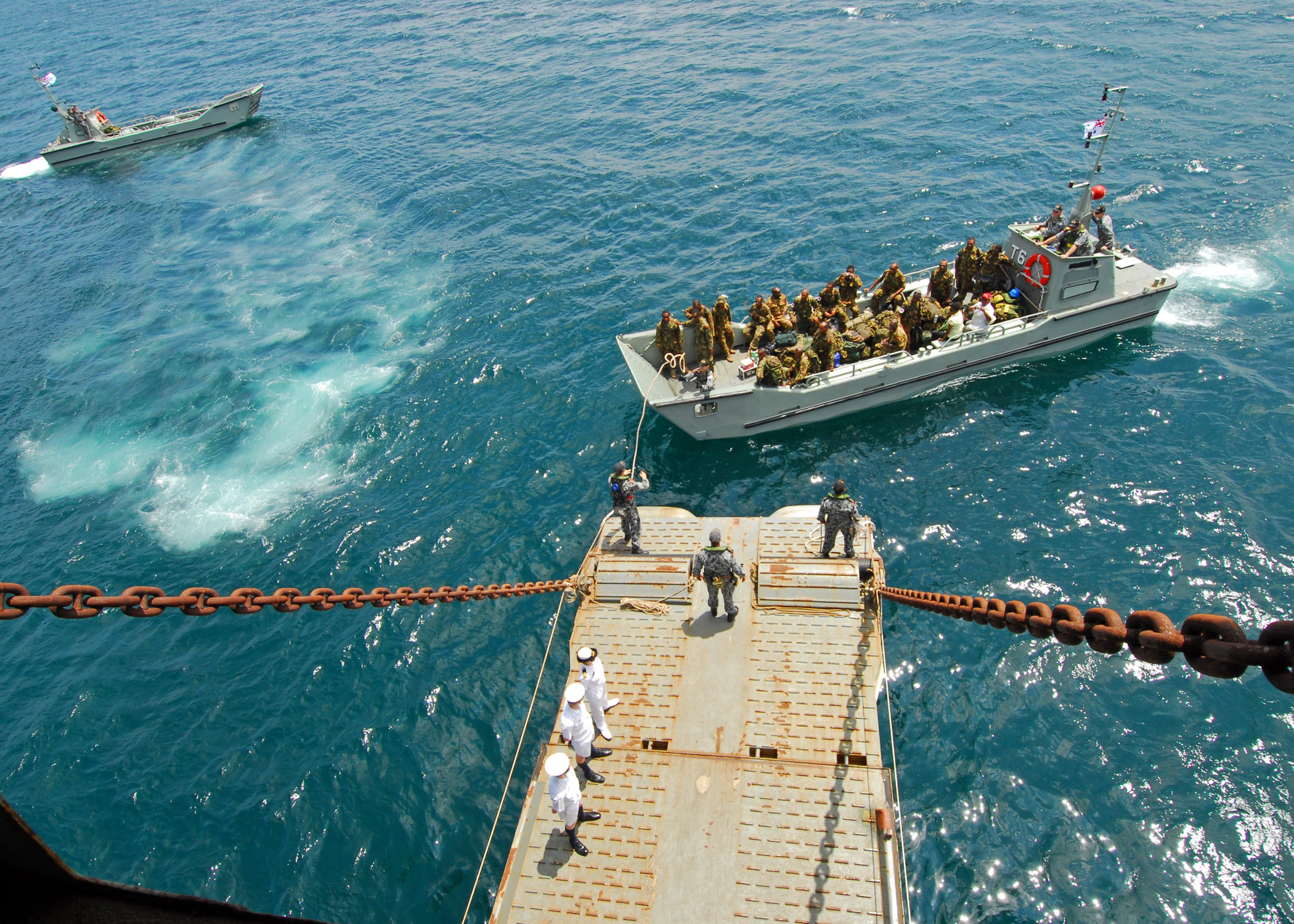
LCVP landing craft operating from HMAS Tobruk

The Australian Defence Force's (ADF's) amphibious warfare capabilities were significantly expanded in 1982 when the landing ship heavy HMAS Tobruk was commissioned. This ship was the first amphibious vessel purpose-built for the RAN and was based on the British Round Table-class landing ship logistics design. She supported ADF operations around the world.

=== Post-Cold War era ===
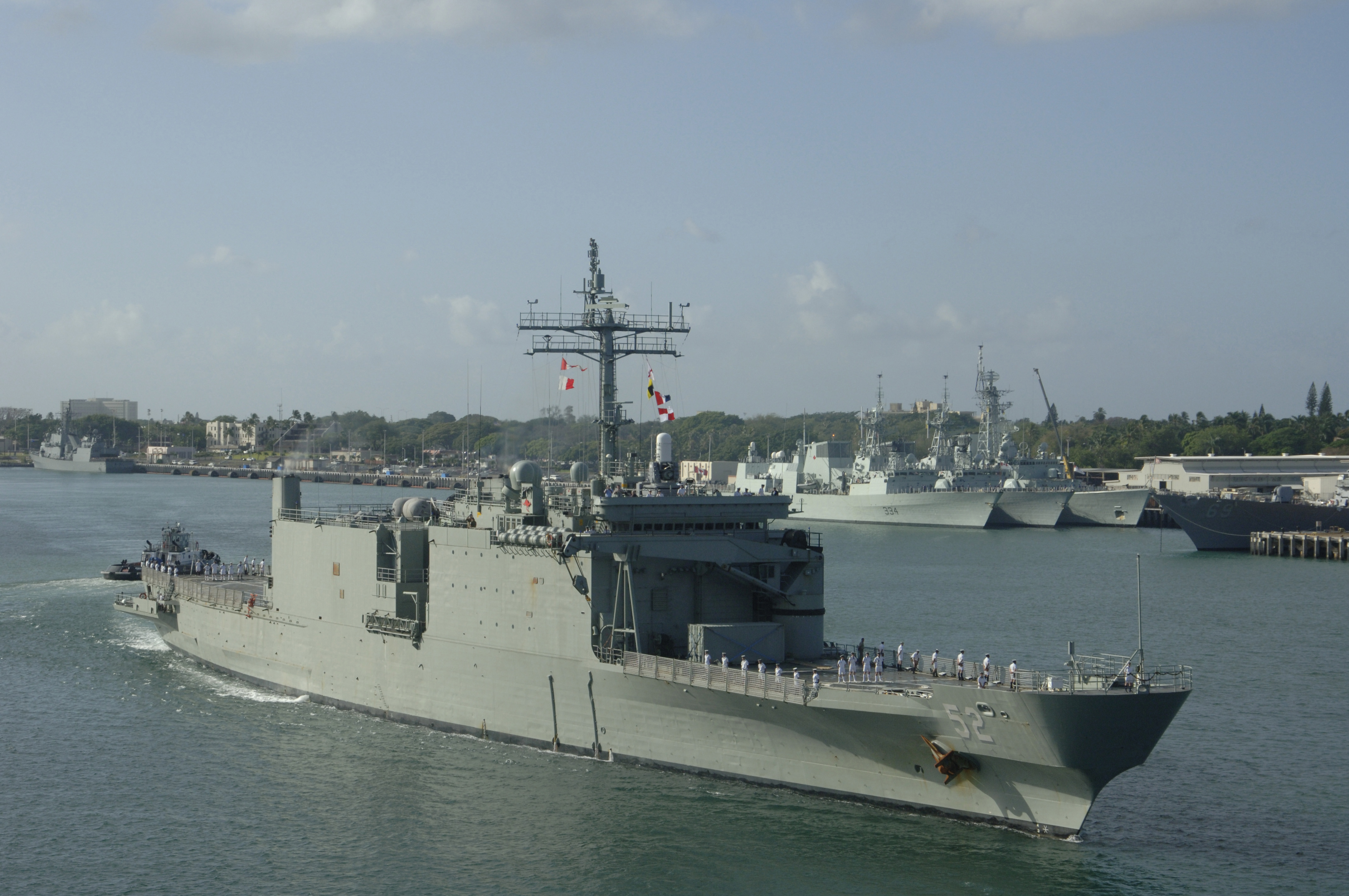
HMAS Manoora in 2006

The ADF's amphibious warfare capabilities were further expanded in 1994 when two Newport-class tank landing ships were purchased from the USN. These ships were greatly modified and finally entered service in the late 1990s as the Kanimbla-class landing platform amphibious (LPA). They supported ADF operations in Afghanistan, Iraq, the Solomon Islands and East Timor. Both LPAs were taken out of service in September 2010 due to concerns about their seaworthiness. On 1 February 2011 the Minister for Defence announced that repairing Manoora would not be cost effective given that the ship was scheduled to retired at the end of 2012 and that she would instead be decommissioned. He also stated that Kanimbla would be repaired but was not expected to return to operational service until mid-2012.

In May 2011 the Australian Government chartered the civilian icebreaker Aurora Australis for two months to provide an amphibious capability while Tobruk was undergoing maintenance.

In 2012, the Australian Government purchased the ADV Ocean Shield to provide the RAN with a third ship for humanitarian and disaster relief tasks. Ocean Shield was transferred to the Australian Border Force in July 2014.

== Current ships ==
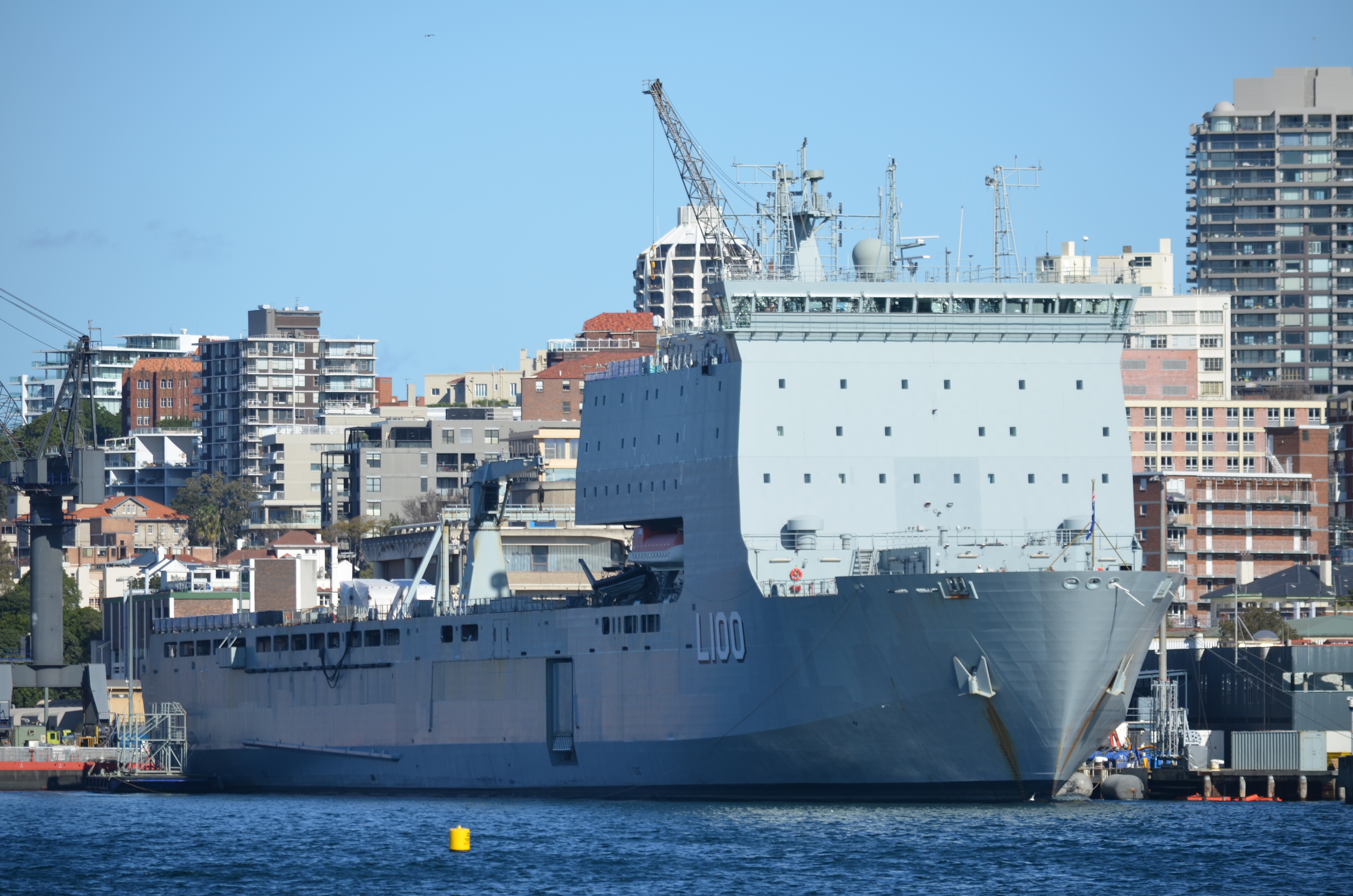
HMAS Choules at Fleet Base East Sydney Harbour, Australia in August 2014

In December 2010, a team from the RAN travelled to Britain to inspect the Bay-class landing ship dock RFA Largs Bay, which was scheduled to be placed in reserve in April 2011, and Australian Defence Minister Stephen Smith stated in January 2011 that Australia was considering purchasing the ship. On 6 April 2011 Smith announced that Australia would buy Largs Bay and that the ship was expected to enter service with the RAN in 2012. The vessel was renamed and commissioned as HMAS Choules (L100) in December 2011.

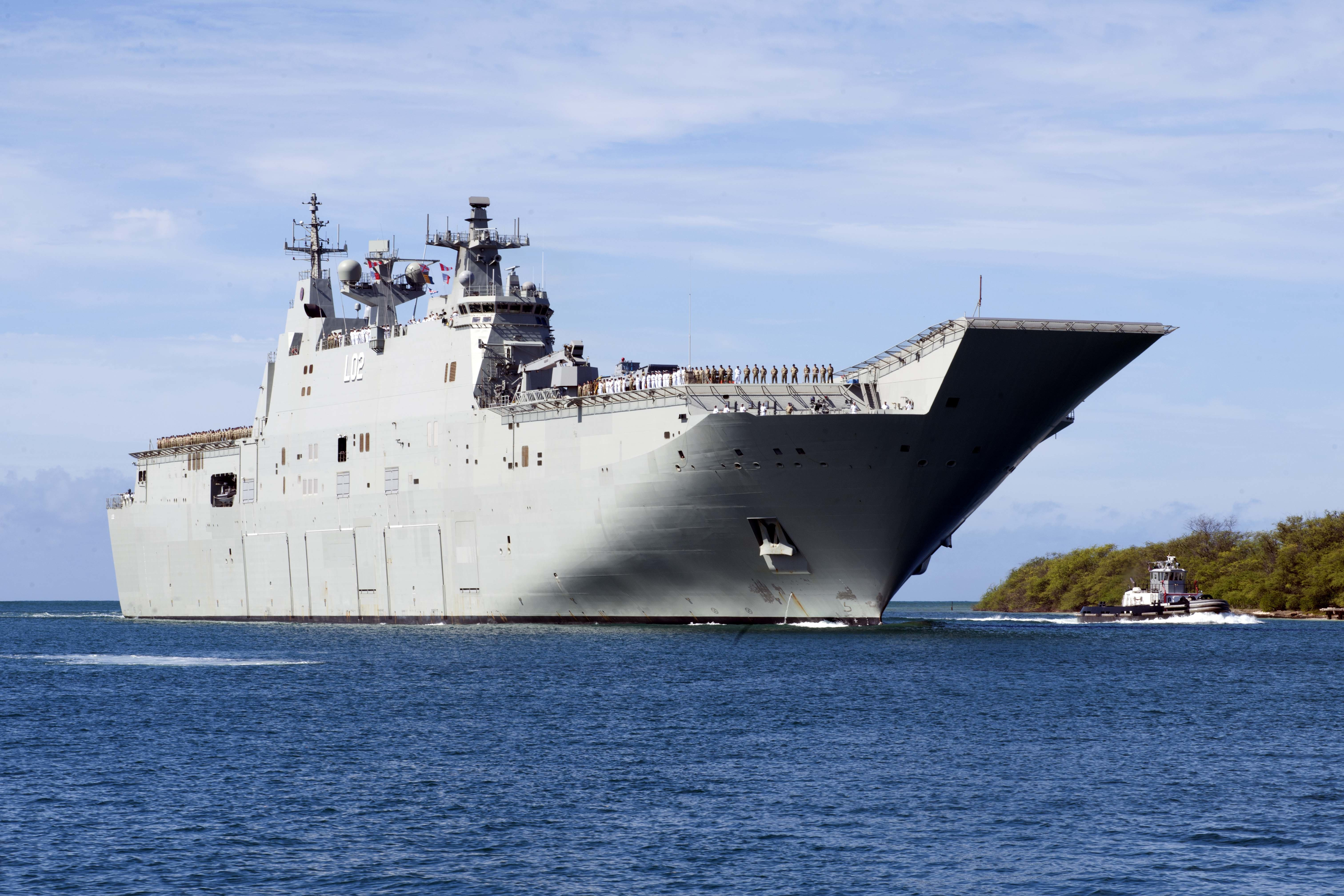
HMAS Canberra arriving at Pearl Harbor for RIMPAC 2016

HMAS Tobruk and one of the LPAs were replaced by two Canberra-class landing helicopter docks (LHDs) between 2012 and 2014. These ships are the largest warships ever operated by the Royal Australian Navy, and each is able to carry an infantry battalion and up to 24 Army and Navy helicopters.

In addition to the seagoing ships, the RAN also operates a number of smaller amphibious craft, including four Landing Craft, Vehicle, Personnel (LCVP) which can carry a Land Rover sized vehicle or 36 personnel (deployable from Choules), and 12 LCM-1E mechanized landing craft (deployable from the Canberra-class ships).
