= BRP Waray =

Heavy landing craft of the Philippine Navy

History

Australia
- Name: HMAS Betano
- Builder: Walkers Limited (Maryborough, Queensland, Australia)
- Laid down: September 1972
- Launched: 5 December 1972
- Commissioned: 8 February 1974
- Decommissioned: 12 December 2012
- Fate: transferred to Philippine Navy.

History

Philippines
- Name: BRP Waray
- Namesake: Waray people, a Filipino ethnic group located in the eastern Visayas islands of Leyte and Samar, Philippines
- Operator: Philippine Navy
- Acquired: 2016
- Commissioned: 1 June 2016
- Status: in active service

General characteristics
- Class & type: Ivatan-class (Balikpapan class)
- Type: Landing Craft Heavy
- Displacement: 364 tons standard 517 tons full load
- Length: 44.5 m (146 ft)
- Beam: 10.1 m (33 ft)
- Draft: 2 m (6 ft 7 in)
- Propulsion: 2 × General Motors Detroit 6–71 diesel motors (original); 2 × Caterpillar 3406E diesel engines (RAN since 2005)
- Speed: 10 knots (19 km/h; 12 mph)
- Range: 3,000 nautical miles (5,600 km; 3,500 mi) unladen 1,300 nautical miles (2,400 km; 1,500 mi) with 175 tons of cargo
- Capacity: 180 tons of cargo
- Complement: 16
- Sensors & processing systems: Racal Decca Bridgemaster I-band navigational radar
- Armament: two 7.62 mm (0.300 in) machine guns

BRP Waray (LC-288) is a heavy landing craft of the Philippine Navy. From 1972 to 2012, it was known as HMAS Betano (L 133) and served the Royal Australian Navy. Betano was decommissioned in December 2012 and stored until it was sold by the Australian government to the Philippine Navy to assist in improving the country's humanitarian and disaster relief capabilities.

Prior to commissioning with the Philippine Navy, the ship, together with the former HMAS Balikpapan and HMAS Wewak, underwent refurbishing, refit, and servicing works in Cebu for a few months.

The ship was commissioned to Philippine Navy, together with two other sister ships and a new landing platform dock, on 1 June 2016 in Manila.

== Operational history ==
In November 2018, BRP Waray conducted a Community Outreach and Education Program to counter violent extremism in Barangay Doña Consuelo, Ozamiz City, Misamis Occidental that benefited 2,137 individuals. The crew of BRP Waray were later given the Military Merit Medal (Philippines) for their participation in the operation.

In December 2018, the ship together with the BRP Agta (LC-290), Multi-Purpose Attack Craft (MPAC) Mk 1 (BA-484), BRP Juan Magluyan (PC-392), Philippine Marine Corps and Naval Special Operations Group units conducted an amphibious operation on Minis Island, Patikul, Sulu that resulted in the neutralization of seven Abu Sayyaf bandits, apprehension of 10 individuals and the recovery of several firearms and other war materials. The crew of BRP Waray were later given the Bronze Cross Medal for their participation in the operation.

In June 2019, BRP Waray with personnel from the Naval Intelligence Service Unit 62 and Naval Special Operations Unit 6 intercepted M/L Lady Rosmina off the waters of Zamboanga City based on a tip that it was undertaking human trafficking operations. Over 100 victims were rescued, they were supposed to be brought to Malaysia thru Tawi-Tawi.

== See also ==
- HMAS Betano (L 133)
- List of ships of the Philippine Navy
