= BRP Agta =

History

Australia
- Name: HMAS Balikpapan
- Builder: Walkers Limited (Maryborough, Queensland, Australia)
- Laid down: 1 May 1971
- Launched: 15 August 1971
- Commissioned: 8 December 1971 (Army)
- Recommissioned: 27 September 1974 (Navy)
- Decommissioned: 12 December 2012
- Fate: transferred to Philippine Navy.

Philippines
- Name: BRP Agta
- Namesake: Agta people, also known as Aeta or Negrito, an indigenous Filipino ethnic group scattered in the island of Luzon, Philippines
- Operator: Philippine Navy
- Acquired: 2016
- Commissioned: 1 June 2016
- Status: in active service

General characteristics
- Class & type: Ivatan-class (Balikpapan-class) Landing Craft Heavy
- Displacement: 364 tons standard 517 tons full load
- Length: 44.5 m (146 ft 0 in)
- Beam: 10.1 m (33 ft 2 in)
- Draft: 2 m (6 ft 7 in)
- Propulsion: 2 × General Motors Detroit 6–71 diesel motors (original); 2 × Caterpillar 3406E diesel engines (RAN since 2005)
- Speed: 10 knots (19 km/h; 12 mph)
- Range: 3,000 nmi (5,600 km; 3,500 mi) unladen 1,300 nmi (2,400 km; 1,500 mi) with 175 tons of cargo
- Capacity: 180 tons of cargo
- Complement: 16
- Sensors & processing systems: Racal Decca Bridgemaster I-band navigational radar
- Armament: 2 × 7.62 mm (0.300 in) machine guns

BRP Agta (LC-290) is a landing craft heavy of the Philippine Navy. From 1972 to 2012, it was known as HMAS Balikpapan and served the Royal Australian Navy. It was decommissioned in December 2012, was stored until it was sold by the Australian government to the Philippine Navy to assist in improving the country's Humaritarian and Disaster Relief capabilities.

Prior to commissioning with the Philippine Navy, the ship, together with the former HMAS Betano and HMAS Wewak, underwent refurbishing, refit, and servicing works in Cebu for a few months.

The ship was commissioned to Philippine Navy, together with 2 other sisterships and a new landing platform dock, on 1 June 2016 in Manila.

== Operational history ==
In December 2018, BRP Agta together with BRP Waray, Multi-Purpose Attack Craft (MPAC) Mk 1 (BA-484), BRP Juan Magluyan, Philippine Marine Corps and Naval Special Operations Group units conducted an Amphibious Operation on Minis Island, Patikul, Sulu that resulted in the neutralization of seven Abu Sayyaf bandits, apprehension of 10 individuals and the recovery of several firearms and other war materials. The crew of the BRP Agta were later given the Military Merit Medal (Philippines) with Spearhead Device for their participation in the operation.

== See also ==
- List of ships of the Philippine Navy
