= BRP Iwak =

History

Australia
- Name: HMAS Wewak
- Builder: Walkers Limited (Maryborough, Queensland, Australia)
- Laid down: 21 March 1972
- Launched: 19 May 1972
- Commissioned: 10 August 1973
- Decommissioned: 11 December 2012
- Fate: transferred to Philippine Navy.

Philippines
- Name: BRP Iwak
- Namesake: Iwak people, a minor Filipino ethnic group found in the Cordillera region in the island of Luzon, Philippines
- Operator: Philippine Navy
- Acquired: 2016
- Commissioned: 1 June 2016
- Status: in active service

General characteristics
- Class & type: Ivatan-class (Balikpapan-class) Landing Craft Heavy
- Displacement: 364 tons standard 517 tons full load
- Length: 44.5 m (146 ft 0 in)
- Beam: 10.1 m (33 ft 2 in)
- Draft: 2 m (6 ft 7 in)
- Propulsion: 2 × General Motors Detroit 6–71 diesel motors (original); 2 × Caterpillar 3406E diesel engines (RAN since 2005)
- Speed: 10 knots (19 km/h; 12 mph)
- Range: 3,000 nautical miles (5,600 km; 3,500 mi) unladen 1,300 nautical miles (2,400 km; 1,500 mi) with 175 tons of cargo
- Capacity: 180 tons of cargo
- Complement: 16
- Sensors & processing systems: Racal Decca Bridgemaster I-band navigational radar
- Armament: 2 × 7.62 mm (0.300 in) machine guns

BRP Iwak (LC-289) is a heavy landing craft of the Philippine Navy. From 1972 to 2012, it was known as HMAS Wewak and served the Royal Australian Navy. It was decommissioned in December 2012, was stored until it was sold by the Australian government to the Philippine Navy to assist in improving the country's Humaritarian and Disaster Relief capabilities.

Prior to commissioning with the Philippine Navy, the ship, together with the former HMAS Betano and HMAS Balikpapan, underwent refurbishing, refit, and servicing works in Cebu for a few months.

The ship was commissioned to Philippine Navy, together with 2 other sister ships and a new landing platform dock, on 1 June 2016 in Manila.

== See also ==
- List of ships of the Philippine Navy
