= Balikpapan (disambiguation) =

Balikpapan is a seaport city of East Kalimantan, Indonesia.

Balikpapan may also refer to:

- Balikpapan Airport (formally Sultan Aji Muhammad Sulaiman Airport), near Balikpapan, East Kalimantan Indonesia
- Balikpapan Gulf, near Balikpapan, Indonesia
- Balikpapan Stadium (formally Batakan Stadium), football stadium in Balikpapan, Indonesia
- Battle of Balikpapan (1942), during the Japanese invasion of Borneo (Kalimantan)
- Battle of Balikpapan (1945), during the Allied invasion of Borneo (Kalimantan)
- Balikpapan-class landing craft heavy, used by the Australian Defence Force and the Papua New Guinea Defence Force
  - HMAS Balikpapan (L 126), lead craft of the class, commissioned in 1971
