= Landing Ship Medium Mark II =

Amphibious warfare ship

History
- Status: Project cancelled before construction began
- Notes: Data from Gillett (1988)

General characteristics
- Propulsion: Three engines
- Speed: 15 knots (28 km/h; 17 mph) (Army); 20 knots (37 km/h; 23 mph) (Navy)
- Aviation facilities: Helicopter deck and refuelling facilities

The Landing Ship Medium Mark II was an amphibious warfare ship developed for the Australian Army in the late 1960s. The Army and Royal Australian Navy (RAN) were unable to reach agreement on the ship's specifications and the project was cancelled in the early 1970s.

== History ==
In the late 1960s, the Australian Army saw a need to replace its four World War II-era Landing Ship Medium (LSM) which had been purchased from the United States in 1959. In response to this requirement, the firm Burness, Corlett and Partners, along with the Australian Shipbuilding Board, drew up plans for a larger ship that could carry more cargo, with three engines and a long, slim hull. Later versions of the plans included a helicopter pad. The ship would be capable of embarking tanks in an enclosed tank deck or on the upper deck with other cargo, and specialised storage areas would be included for refrigerated, explosive and flammable supplies.

The Army and RAN disagreed on aspects of the Landing Ship Medium Mark II's design. Unlike other contemporary designs, it was planned that the ship would not carry smaller landing craft, but rather discharge her cargo via a ramp fitted to her bow. While the Army wanted the ship to have a bow door to enable her to be beached, the navy preferred a fully sealed bow so that she could make 20 knots (37 km/h; 23 mph) and sail in convoys. These differing views were not resolved, and the design team experienced problems meeting the Army's requirements.

As a result of the difficulties with the project, the Landing Ship Medium Mark II was cancelled in the early 1970s. Instead, the Army ordered eight Balikpapan-class landing craft heavy to replace the LSMs. Only the first of these ships actually served with the Army, however, as responsibility for seagoing ships was transferred to the RAN shortly after she entered service.
