= HMPNGS Salamaua =

Papua New Guinea Defence Force vessel

History

Australia
- Namesake: Island of Salamaua
- Builder: Walkers Limited
- Laid down: 29 May 1972
- Launched: 27 July 1972
- Commissioned: 19 October 1973
- Decommissioned: 14 November 1974
- Motto: "Ready For Anything"
- Fate: Transferred to Papua New Guinea Defence Force
- Badge

Papua New Guinea
- Acquired: 14 November 1974
- Status: Retired 19/6/2020

General characteristics
- Class & type: Balikpapan-class landing craft heavy
- Displacement: 316 tons
- Length: 44.5 m (146 ft)
- Beam: 10.1 m (33 ft)
- Propulsion: 2 x GE diesels
- Speed: 9 knots (17 km/h; 10 mph)
- Capacity: 180 tons of vehicle cargo or 400 soldiers
- Complement: 13
- Armament: 2 x 0.50 inch machine guns

HMPNGS Salamaua is a Balikpapan-class heavy landing craft operated by the Papua New Guinea Defence Force (PNGDF). Prior to 1974, the vessel was called HMAS Salamaua (L 131) and was operated by the Royal Australian Navy (RAN).

== Design and construction ==
The eight-vessel Balikpapan class was ordered as a locally manufactured replacement for the Australian Army's LSM-1-class landing ship medium and ALC 50 landing craft. They are 44.5 metres (146 ft) long, with a beam of 10.1 metres (33 ft), and a draught of 1.9 metres (6 ft 3 in). The landing craft have a standard displacement of 316 tons, with a full load displacement of 503 tons. They are propelled by two G.M. Detroit 6-71 diesel motors, providing 675 brake horsepower to the two propeller shafts, allowing the vessels to reach 9 knots (17 km/h; 10 mph). The standard ship's company is 13-strong. The Balikpapans are equipped with a Decca RM 916 navigational radar, and fitted with two 7.62 millimetres (0.300 in) machine guns for self-defence.

The LCHs have a maximum payload of 180 tons; equivalent to 3 Leopard 1 tanks, 13 M113 armored personnel carriers 23 quarter-tonne trucks, or four LARC-V amphibious cargo vehicles. As a troop transport, a Balikpapan-class vessel can transport up to 400 soldiers between a larger amphibious ship and the shore, or embark 60 soldiers in six-berth caravans for longer voyages. The vessel's payload affects the range: at 175 tons of cargo, each vessel has a range of 1,300 nautical miles (2,400 km; 1,500 mi), which increases to 2,280 nautical miles (4,220 km; 2,620 mi) with a 150-ton payload, and 3,000 nautical miles (5,600 km; 3,500 mi) when unladen. The flat, box-like keel causes the ships to roll considerably in other-than-calm conditions, limiting their ability to make long voyages.

Salamaua was laid down Walkers Limited at Maryborough, Queensland on 29 May 1972, launched on 27 July 1972, and commissioned into the RAN on 19 October 1973.

== Operational history ==
Salamaua was transferred to the Papua New Guinea Defence Force on 14 November 1974. She was in active service as of 2013. She was retired on June 19, 2020.

== Sources ==
Books

- Gillett, Ross (1988). Australian and New Zealand Warships since 1946. Brookvale, NSW: Child & Associates. ISBN 0-86777-219-0. OCLC 23470364.
- Wertheim, Eric, ed. (2007). The Naval Institute Guide to Combat Fleets of the World: Their Ships, Aircraft, and Systems (15th ed.). Annapolis, MD: Naval Institute Press. p. 26. ISBN 978-1-59114-955-2. OCLC 140283156.

Journal articles

- Swinden, Greg (April 2013). "Heavy Lifting for Four Decades: The Navy's Landing Craft Heavy". The Navy. 75 (2). Navy League of Australia: 20–24. ISSN 1322-6231.
