= HMAS Wewak =

1972 Balikpapan-class heavy landing craft

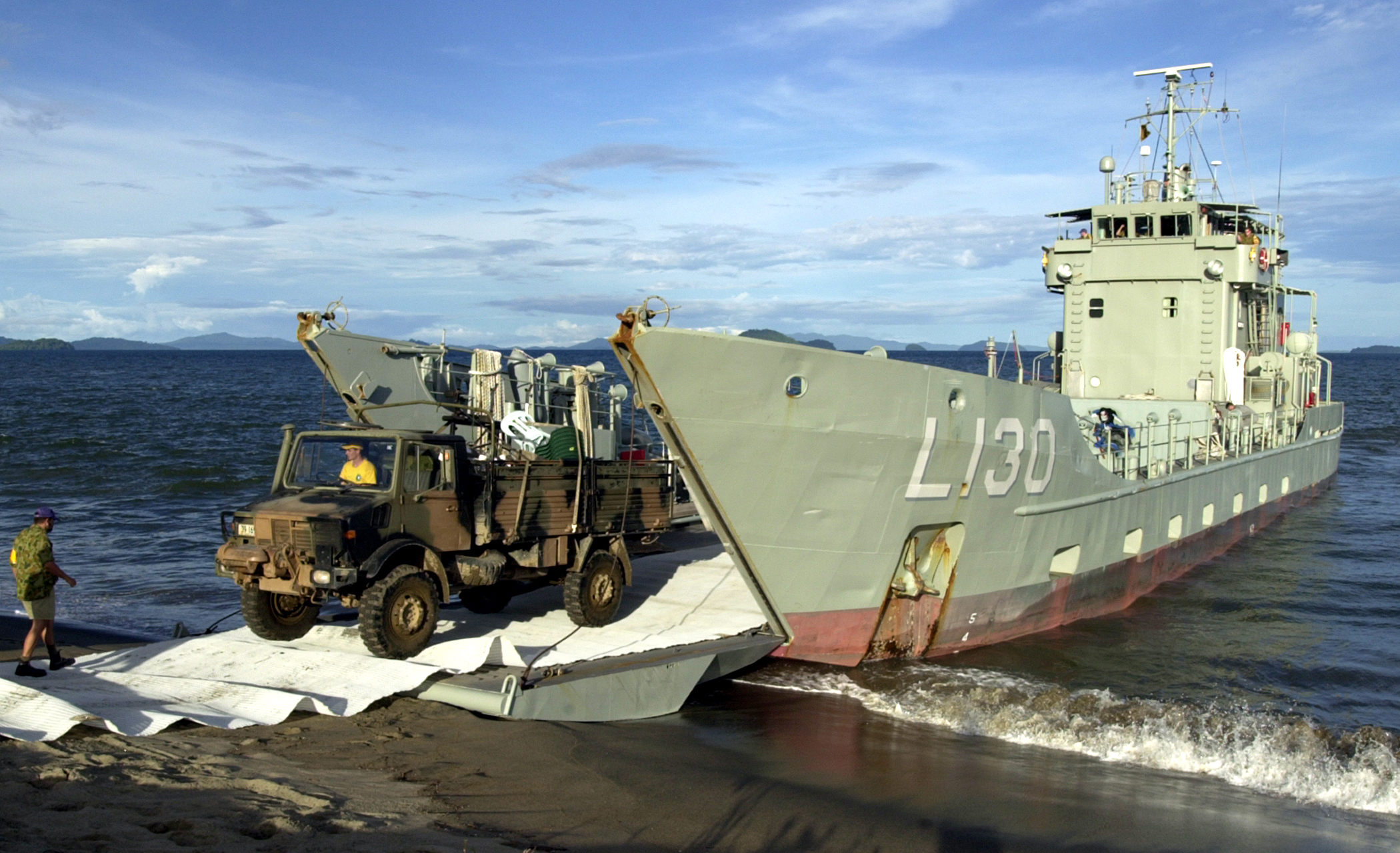
- HMAS Wewak unloading or loading an Australian Army truck during Operation Bel Isi on Bougainville

History

Australia
- Namesake: Wewak, Papua New Guinea
- Builder: Walkers Limited in Maryborough, Queensland
- Laid down: 21 March 1972
- Launched: 19 May 1972
- Commissioned: 10 August 1973
- Decommissioned: 11 December 2012
- Home port: HMAS Cairns
- Motto: "Do Not Yield"
- Fate: Transferred to Philippine Navy.
- Badge

Philippines
- Name: Iwak
- Namesake: Iwak people, a minor Filipino ethnic group found in the Cordillera region in the island of Luzon, Philippines
- Acquired: 2016
- Commissioned: 1 June 2016

General characteristics
- Class & type: Balikpapan-class landing craft heavy
- Displacement: 316 tons
- Length: 44.5 m (146 ft)
- Beam: 10.1 m (33 ft)
- Propulsion: Two GM Detroit 12v71 diesels
- Speed: 9 knots (17 km/h; 10 mph)
- Capacity: 180 tons of vehicle cargo or 400 soldiers
- Complement: 13
- Armament: two 0.50 inch machine guns

HMAS Wewak (L 130) was the fifth ship of the Balikpapan class of heavy landing craft operated by the Royal Australian Navy (RAN).

== Design and construction ==
The eight-vessel Balikpapan class was ordered as a locally manufactured replacement for the Australian Army's LSM-1-class landing ship medium and ALC 50 landing craft. They are 44.5 metres (146 ft) long, with a beam of 10.1 metres (33 ft), and a draught of 1.9 metres (6 ft 3 in). The landing craft have a standard displacement of 316 tons, with a full load displacement of 503 tons. They are propelled by two G.M. Detroit 6-71 diesel motors, providing 675 brake horsepower to the two propeller shafts, allowing the vessels to reach 9 knots (17 km/h; 10 mph). The standard ship's company is 13-strong. The Balikpapans are equipped with a Decca RM 916 navigational radar, and fitted with two 7.62 millimetres (0.300 in) machine guns for self-defence.

The LCHs have a maximum payload of 180 tons; equivalent to 3 Leopard 1 tanks, 13 M113 armoured personnel carriers 23 quarter-tonne trucks, or four LARC-V amphibious cargo vehicles. As a troop transport, a Balikpapan-class vessel can transport up to 400 soldiers between a larger amphibious ship and the shore, or embark 60 soldiers in six-berth caravans for longer voyages. The vessel's payload affects the range: at 175 tons of cargo, each vessel has a range of 1,300 nautical miles (2,400 km; 1,500 mi), which increases to 2,280 nautical miles (4,220 km; 2,620 mi) with a 150-ton payload, and 3,000 nautical miles (5,600 km; 3,500 mi) when unladen. The flat, box-like keel causes the ships to roll considerably in other-than-calm conditions, limiting their ability to make long voyages.

Wewak was laid down by Walkers Limited at Maryborough, Queensland on 21 March 1972, launched on 19 May 1972, and commissioned into the RAN on 10 August 1973.

== Operational history ==
Following the destruction of Darwin by Cyclone Tracy during the night of 24–25 December 1974, Wewak was deployed as part of the relief effort; Operation Navy Help Darwin. Wewak was the last of the 13 ships to join the operation; sailing from Brisbane on 2 January 1975, and arriving on 13 January.

Wewak was placed in reserve on 16 August 1985; one of three landing craft decommissioned for economic reasons. She was reactivated in late 2000, but only after lengthy delays, as during the intervening years, she had been used as a parts hulk for the other Balikpapans.

== Decommissioning and Fate ==
Wewak was decommissioned on 11 December 2012.

The Philippine Navy has shown interest in acquiring the ship, after the Australian government donated 2 other sisterships, HMAS Brunei and HMAS Tarakan in 2015. It was later confirmed that the Philippine Navy is acquiring three more LCH from Australia, including ex-HMAS Wewak, at a token price.

== Sources ==
Books

- Gillett, Ross (1988). Australian and New Zealand Warships since 1946. Brookvale, NSW: Child & Associates. ISBN 0-86777-219-0. OCLC 23470364.
- Wertheim, Eric, ed. (2007). The Naval Institute Guide to Combat Fleets of the World: Their Ships, Aircraft, and Systems (15th ed.). Annapolis, MD: Naval Institute Press. ISBN 978-1-59114-955-2. OCLC 140283156.

Journal articles

- "Disaster Relief — Cyclone Tracy and Tasman Bridge". Semaphore. 2004 (14). Sea Power Centre. December 2004. Archived from the original on 13 February 2009.
- Swinden, Greg (April 2013). "Heavy Lifting for Four Decades: The Navy's Landing Craft Heavy". The Navy. 75 (2). Navy League of Australia: 20–24. ISSN 1322-6231.
