= HMAS Balikpapan =

1971 Balikpapan-class landing craft heavy

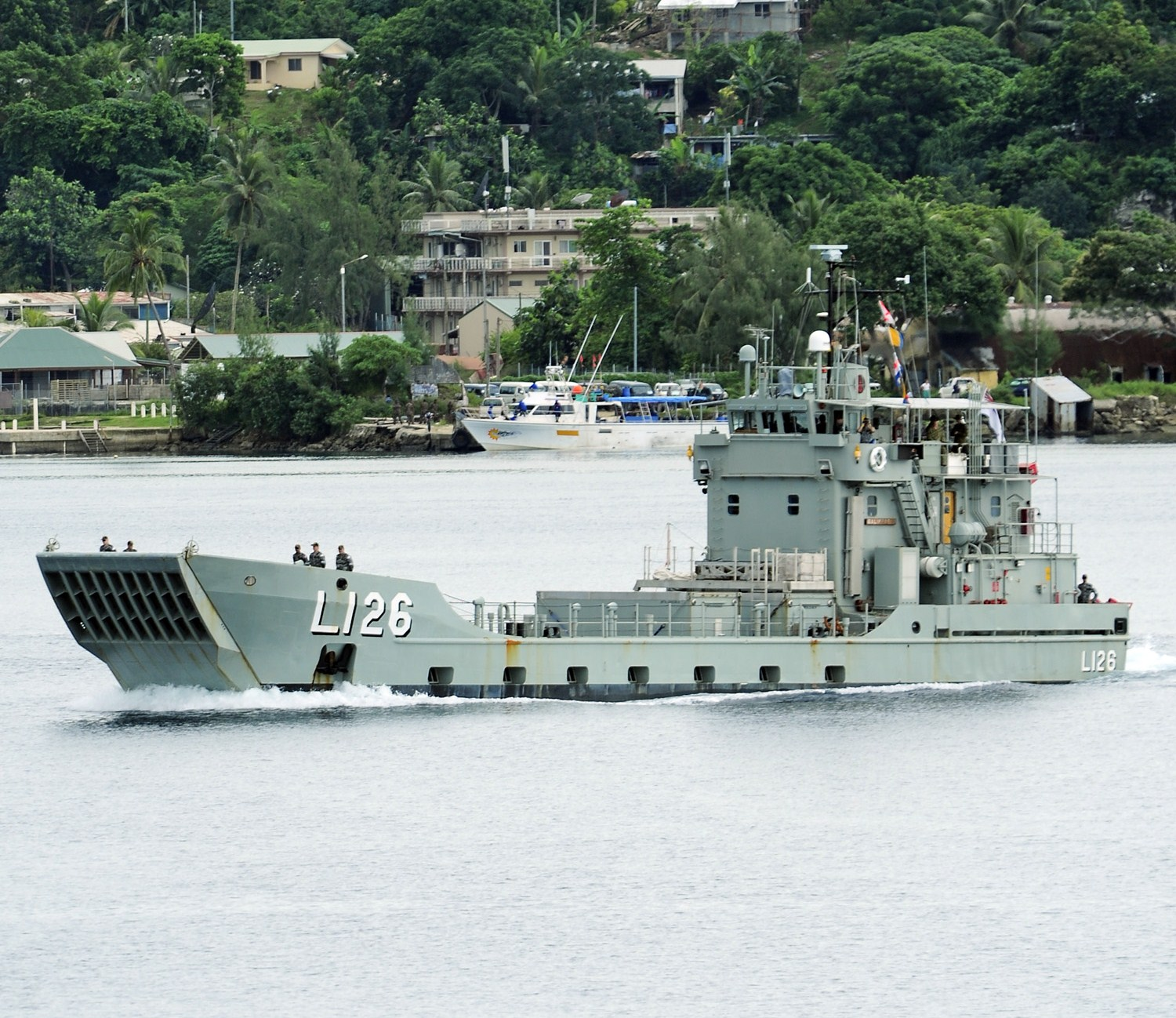
- HMAS Balikpapan in 2011

History

Australia
- Namesake: Battle of Balikpapan (1945)
- Builder: Walkers Limited
- Laid down: 1 May 1971
- Launched: 15 August 1971
- Commissioned: 8 December 1971 (Army)
- Recommissioned: 27 September 1974 (Navy)
- Decommissioned: 12 December 2012
- Motto: "Bravely in Action"
- Honours and awards: Battle honours: East Timor 1999-2000
- Status: Awaiting disposal
- Badge

General characteristics
- Class & type: Balikpapan-class landing craft heavy
- Displacement: 316 tons
- Length: 44.5 m (146 ft)
- Beam: 10.1 m (33 ft)
- Propulsion: Two Caterpillar diesels
- Speed: 10 knots (19 km/h; 12 mph)
- Capacity: 180 tons of vehicle cargo or 400 soldiers
- Complement: 13
- Armament: 2 × 0.50 inch machine guns

HMAS Balikpapan (L 126) was the lead ship of the Balikpapan class of heavy landing craft (LCH). Ordered in 1969, Balikpapan entered service with the Australian Army Water Transport Squadron in late 1971. After this, the decision to place all seagoing Army vessels under the control of the Royal Australian Navy (RAN) saw Balikpapan transferred and commissioned in 1974; the last of the eight-vessel class to enter RAN service. Balikpapan was placed in reserve in 1985, but was reactivated three years later. During late 1999 and early 2000, the vessel was part of the INTERFET peacekeeping taskforce, and made additional deployments to East Timor in 2001 and 2006. On 12 December 2012, Balikpapan was retired from RAN service.

== Design and construction ==
The eight-vessel Balikpapan class was ordered as a locally manufactured replacement for the Australian Army's LSM-1-class landing ship medium and ALC 50 landing craft. They are 44.5 metres (146 ft) long, with a beam of 10.1 metres (33 ft), and a draught of 1.9 metres (6 ft 3 in). The landing craft have a standard displacement of 316 tons, with a full load displacement of 503 tons. They are propelled by two G.M. Detroit 6-71 diesel motors, providing 675 brake horsepower to the two propeller shafts, allowing the vessels to reach 9 knots (17 km/h; 10 mph). The standard ship's company is 13-strong. The Balikpapans are equipped with a Decca RM 916 navigational radar, and fitted with two 7.62 millimetres (0.300 in) machine guns for self-defence.

The LCHs have a maximum payload of 180 tons; equivalent to 3 Leopard 1 tanks, 13 M113 armoured personnel carriers 23 quarter-tonne trucks, or four LARC-V amphibious cargo vehicles. As a troop transport, a Balikpapan-class vessel can transport up to 400 soldiers between a larger amphibious ship and the shore, or embark 60 soldiers in six-berth caravans for longer voyages. The vessel's payload affects the range: at 175 tons of cargo, each vessel has a range of 1,300 nautical miles (2,400 km; 1,500 mi), which increases to 2,280 nautical miles (4,220 km; 2,620 mi) with a 150-ton payload, and 3,000 nautical miles (5,600 km; 3,500 mi) when unladen. The flat, box-like keel causes the ships to roll considerably in other-than-calm conditions, limiting their ability to make long voyages.

Balikpapan was laid down by Walkers Limited at Maryborough, Queensland on 1 May 1971, launched on 15 August 1971, and assigned to the Australian Army Water Transport Squadron on 8 December 1971. After completing sea trials, Balikpapan began full operational service in 1972, with a combined RAN/Army crew.

== Operational history ==
In 1972, the decision was made that all Army seagoing vessels would be transferred to the RAN, with the Army retaining control of small landing craft and harbour support vessels. Balikpapan was transferred to the RAN and commissioned on 27 September 1974; as the other seven LCHs had commissioned into the RAN on completion, Balikpapan was the last to enter naval service.

Balikpapan was one of the first ships to depart for Darwin to render assistance after Cyclone Tracy hit that city in December 1974, sailing on 26 December from Brisbane with sister ship Betano.

During May and June 1984, Balikpapan completed a 5,400-nautical-mile (10,000 km; 6,200 mi) transit from Brisbane to Penang, transporting vehicles, equipment, and personnel to RAAF Butterworth. Departing on 28 May, the vessel visited Cairns, Darwin, Jakarta, and Singapore, before unloading at Penang between 23 and 25 June. The landing craft returned via Singapore, Benoa, Darwin, and Cairns, and reached Brisbane on 7 August; the longest ocean voyage undertaken by a vessel of her class.

Balikpapan was paid off into reserve at Cairns on 18 September 1985; one of three landing craft decommissioned for economic reasons. She was recommissioned in 1990, although initially only for use as a training vessel attached to the Royal Australian Naval Reserve Darwin Division. The vessel was seconded to Operation Beachcomber on several occasions between 1991 and 1995 for hydrographic duties.

Balikpapan was deployed to East Timor as part of the Australian-led INTERFET peacekeeping taskforce. The landing craft was attached to INTERFET on two occasions; first from 20 September to 13 October 1999, then from 8 December 1999 to 15 January 2000. The ship was later awarded the battle honour "East Timor 1999-2000" in recognition of her service. From January to September 2000, the vessel was docked in Cairns for a life-of-type-extension refit. Post-refit, Balikpapan returned to East Timor to operate in support of UNTAET: November to December 2000, February to March 2001, May to June 2001, and July to August 2001.

Balikpapan returned to East Timor in 2006 during Operation Astute.

This vessel participated in Exercises Triton Thunder and Cassowary during May 2012. Balikpapan operated off Dundee Beach in the Northern Territory in concert with units from the Indonesian Navy and RAN Fleet Air Arm.

== Decommissioning and fate ==
Balikpapan was decommissioned at Darwin on 12 December 2012.

The Philippine Navy has shown interest in acquiring the ship, after the Australian government donated two other sister ships, HMAS Brunei and HMAS Tarakan in 2015. It was later confirmed that the Philippine Navy is acquiring three more LCH from Australia, including ex-HMAS Balikpapan, at a token price.
