= Balikpapan-class landing craft =

In service with the Australian Defence Force and the Papua New Guinea Defence Force

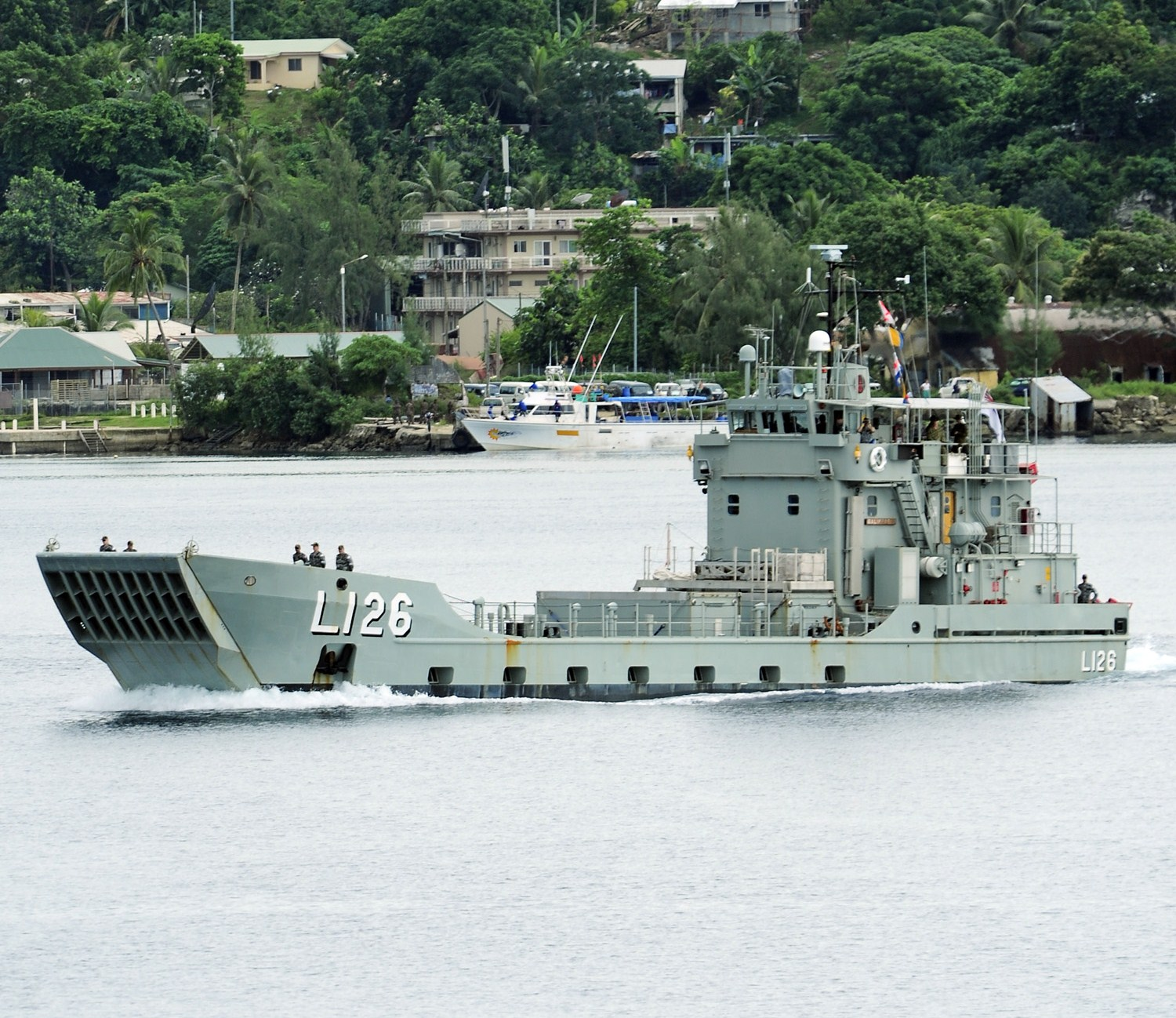
- HMAS Balikpapan in 2011

Class overview
- Builders: Walkers Limited at Maryborough, Queensland
- Operators: Royal Australian Navy (Historic); Papua New Guinea Maritime Element; Philippine Navy
- Preceded by: LSM-1-class landing ship medium (RAN)
- Succeeded by: LST 100 (RAN)
- Built: 1971–1974
- In service: 1971–present
- In commission: 1973–present
- Completed: 8
- Active: 6
- Retired: 2

General characteristics
- Type: Landing Craft Heavy
- Displacement: 364 tons standard; 517 tons full load
- Length: 44.5 m (146 ft)
- Beam: 10.1 m (33 ft)
- Draught: 2 m (6 ft 7 in)
- Propulsion: 2 × Detroit 12–71 diesel motors (original); 2 × Caterpillar 3406E diesel engines (RAN since 2005)
- Speed: 10 knots (19 km/h; 12 mph)
- Range: 3,000 nautical miles (5,600 km; 3,500 mi) unladen; 1,300 nautical miles (2,400 km; 1,500 mi) with 175 tons of cargo
- Capacity: 180 tons of cargo: 3 Leopard 1 tanks 2 M1 Abrams tanks 13 M113 APCs 23 Quarter Tonne trucks 4 LARC-V
- Complement: 16
- Sensors & processing systems: Racal Decca Bridgemaster I-band navigational radar
- Armament: two 12.7 mm (0.50 in) machine guns

The Balikpapan class is a class of eight heavy landing craft. All eight were built by Walkers Limited for the Australian Army in the early 1970s. A reorganisation of watercraft responsibilities in the Australian military meant the landing craft were operated by the Royal Australian Navy (RAN), with seven commissioned directly into RAN service during 1973 and 1974, and lead ship Balikpapan transferred from the army to the navy. During the leadup to the independence of Papua New Guinea in 1975, two of the vessels (HMPNGS Salamaua and HMPNGS Buna) were transferred to the new Papua New Guinea Defence Force (PNGDF).

During their careers, the Australian vessels have operated in support of Operation Navy Help Darwin in 1974–1975, Operation Bel Isi from 1997 to 2003, INTERFET operations in 1999 and 2000, and RAMSI operations from 2003.

The six remaining RAN vessels were paid off in the 2010s: Balikpapan, Betano, and Wewak in 2012; Brunei, Labuan, and Tarakan in 2014. They are yet to be replaced in RAN service. In 2014, the former Labuan was transferred to Papua New Guinea as the training ship HMPNGS Lakekamu. Brunei and Tarakan were refitted and donated to the Philippine Navy in 2015, commissioning as Ivatan and Batak. Three additional units of the class - decommissioned units former HMAS Balikpapan, HMAS Wewak and HMAS Betano - were sold in 2016 to the Philippine Navy. The PNGDF decommissioned Salamaua in 2020 and Buna in 2021.

== Design and capabilities ==
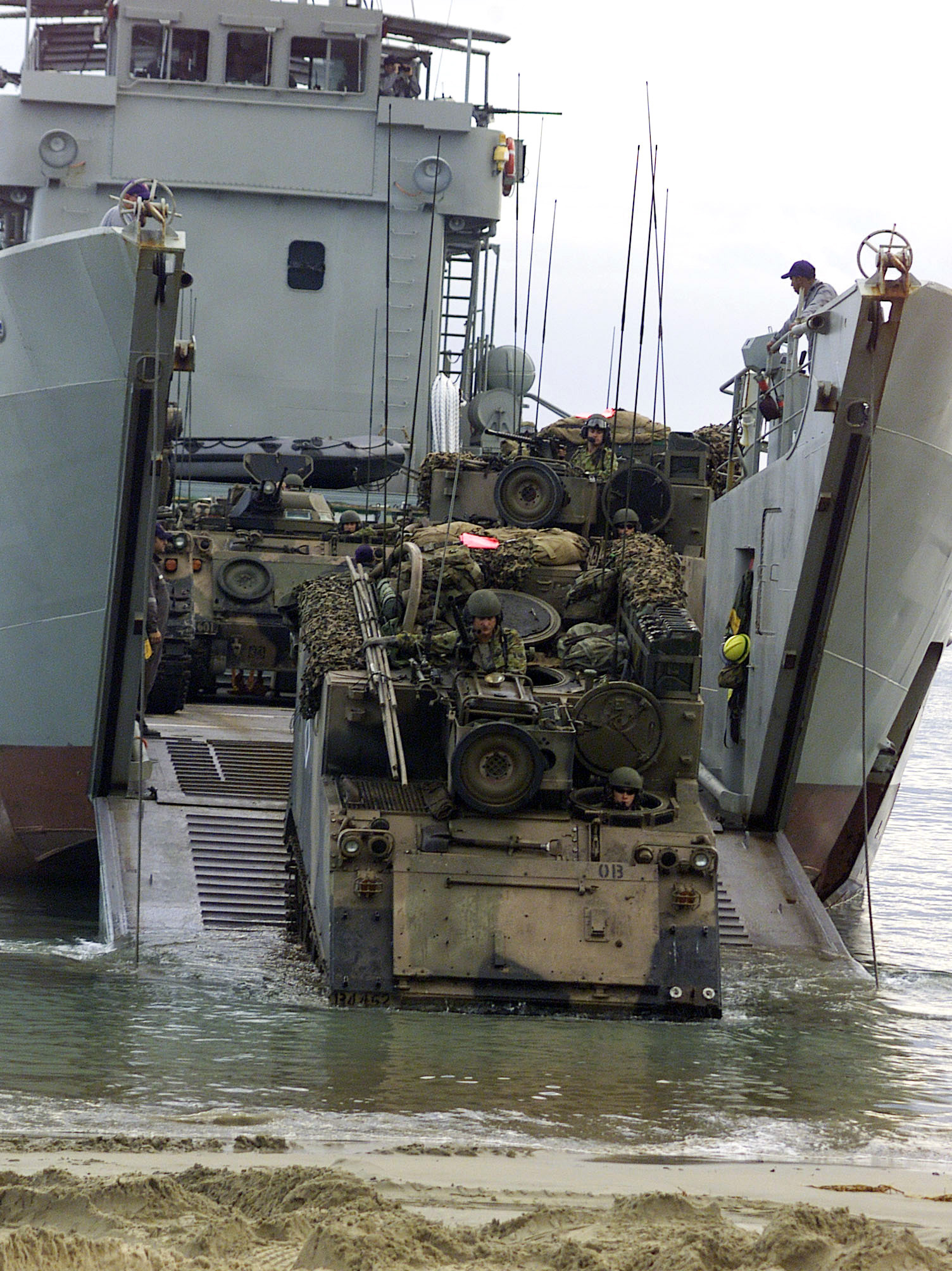
M-113 armoured personnel carriers disembarking on a beach from a Balikpapan-class landing craft

Eight new heavy landing craft were ordered in 1969 as a locally manufactured replacement for the Australian Army's four LSM-1-class landing ship medium and two ALC 50 landing craft after the Landing Ship Medium Mark II project was cancelled. They are 44.5 metres (146 ft) long, with a beam of 10.1 metres (33 ft), and a draught of 2 metres (6 ft 7 in). The landing craft have a standard displacement of 320 tons, with a full load displacement of 517 tons. They were originally built with two Detroit 12–71 diesel motors. These were replaced by Caterpillar 3406E diesel engines between 2005 and 2007 for those still in Australian service. The standard ship's company is 16-strong, including two officers. The sensor suite is limited to a Racel Decca Bridgemaster I-band navigational radar. They are fitted with two 12.7-millimetre (0.50 in) machine guns for self-defence.

The LCHs have a maximum payload of 180 tons; equivalent to three Leopard 1 or two M1A1 Abrams tanks, 13 M113 armored personnel carriers, 23 quarter-tonne trucks, or four LARC-V amphibious cargo vehicles. As a troop transport, a Balikpapan class vessel can transport up to 400 soldiers between a larger amphibious ship and the shore, or embark 60 soldiers in six-berth caravans for longer voyages. The vessel's payload affects the range: at 175 tons of cargo, each vessel has a range of 1,300 nautical miles (2,400 km; 1,500 mi), which increases to 2,280 nautical miles (4,220 km; 2,620 mi) with a 150-ton payload, and 3,000 nautical miles (5,600 km; 3,500 mi) when unladen. The flat, box-like keel causes the ships to roll considerably in other-than-calm conditions, limiting their ability to make long voyages. The LCHs can mate their bow ramp to the stern loading dock of the RAN's large amphibious warfare ships when operating in the ship-to-shore role.

All eight Balikpapan-class vessels were constructed by Walkers Limited at its shipyard in Maryborough, Queensland. All were laid down during 1971 and 1972, with lead ship Balikpapan entering service with the Australian Army Water Transport Squadron at the end of 1971. After this, responsibility for seagoing Army craft was transferred to the RAN, with the other seven craft directly entering naval service during 1973 and 1974, and Balikpapan transferring over in late 1974.

== Operational history ==
=== Australian service ===
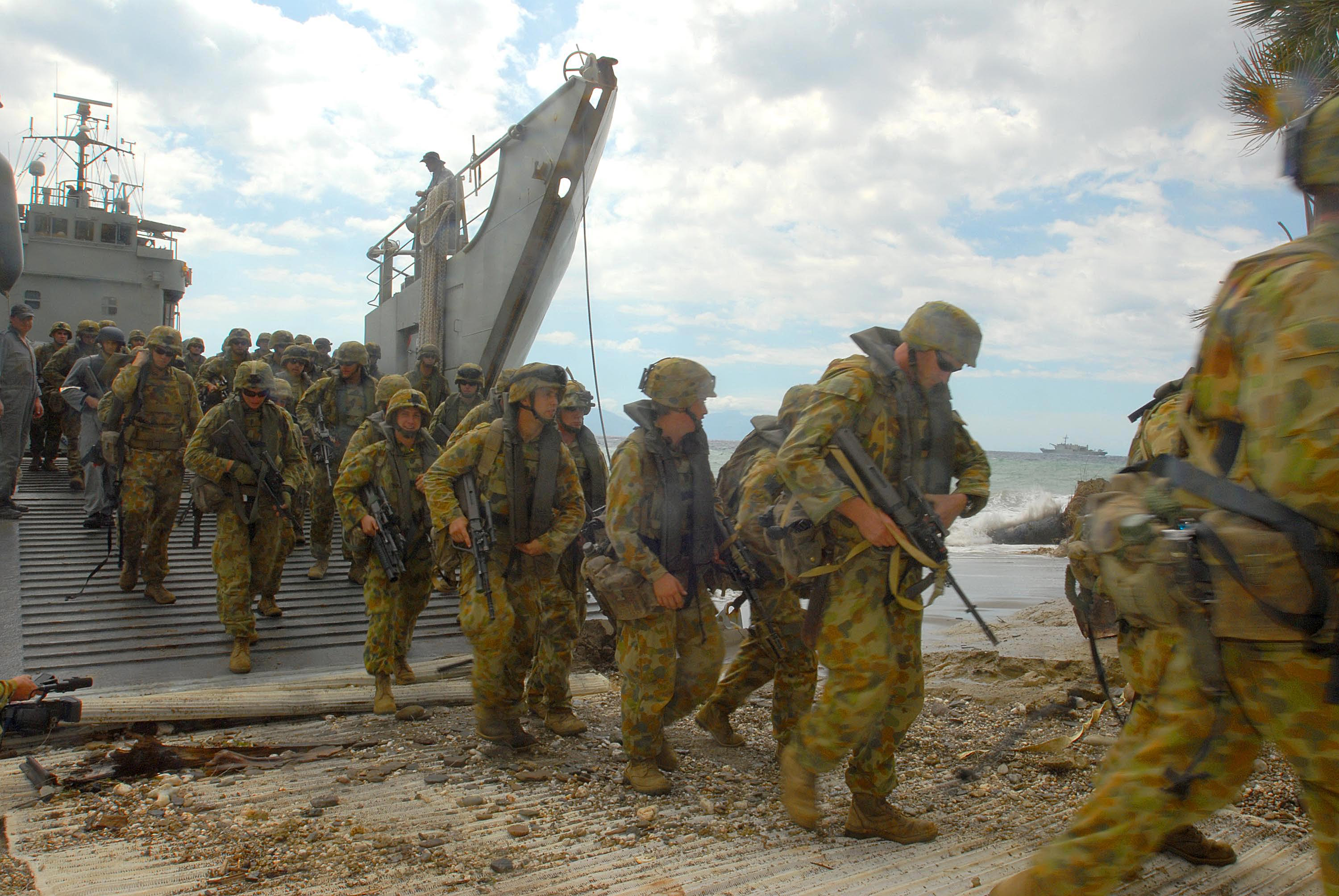
Australian troops landing in East Timor 2006, using HMAS Balikpapan

In January 1973, the Balikpapans in RAN service were formed together as the First Australian Landing Craft Squadron, based at HMAS Moreton in Brisbane. In November 1974, Salamaua and Buna were transferred to the fledgling Papua New Guinea Defence Force, along with five Attack-class patrol boats. Five of the remaining Australian LCHs were deployed in December 1974 following Cyclone Tracy as part of Operation Navy Help Darwin; HMAS Labuan was undergoing refits at the time.

HMAS Labuan was assigned to the Royal Australian Navy Reserve in June 1979, and attached to the Brisbane Port Division. Three LCHs, Tarakan, Balikpapan, and Wewak were placed in reserve at NQEA in Cairns during August and September 1985. They were reactivated in 1988, 1990, and 2000, respectively. On entering service, Brunei and Betano initially supplemented the inshore hydrographic survey capabilities of the RAN until late 1988, when they were reassigned to the naval base HMAS Waterhen for use in diver training. During May and June 1984, Balikpapan completed a 5,400-nautical-mile (10,000 km; 6,200 mi) transit from Brisbane to Penang, transporting vehicles, equipment, and personnel to RAAF Butterworth; the longest ocean voyage undertaken by a vessel of this class.

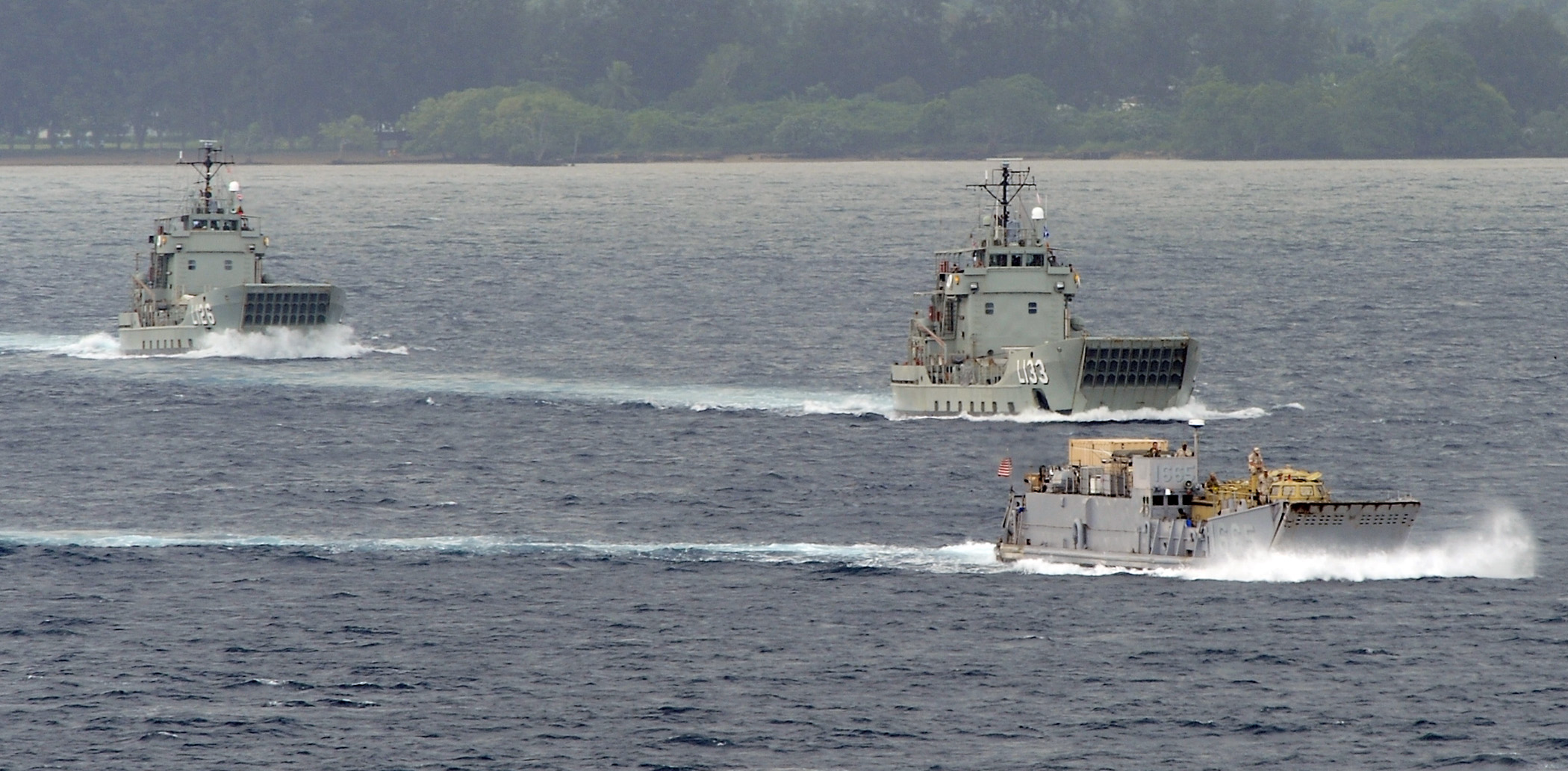
Balikpapan (left), Wewak, and a United States Navy Landing Craft Utility underway during Pacific Partnership 2011

Between 1997 and 2003, the LCHs were used to support the Peace Monitoring Group (PMG) in Bougainville, under Operation Bel Isi. Ships deployed on this operation were involved in resupplying the PMG base in Loloho, transport of PMG personnel and humanitarian aid, and coastal patrols. From 1999 onwards, the Balikpapans were also tasked with supporting INTERFET operations in East Timor, particularly those relating to the Oecussi enclave. The increase in operational tempo was a major factor in the reactivation of Wewak in 2000. In 2003, the landing craft began supporting RAMSI operations in the Solomon Islands.

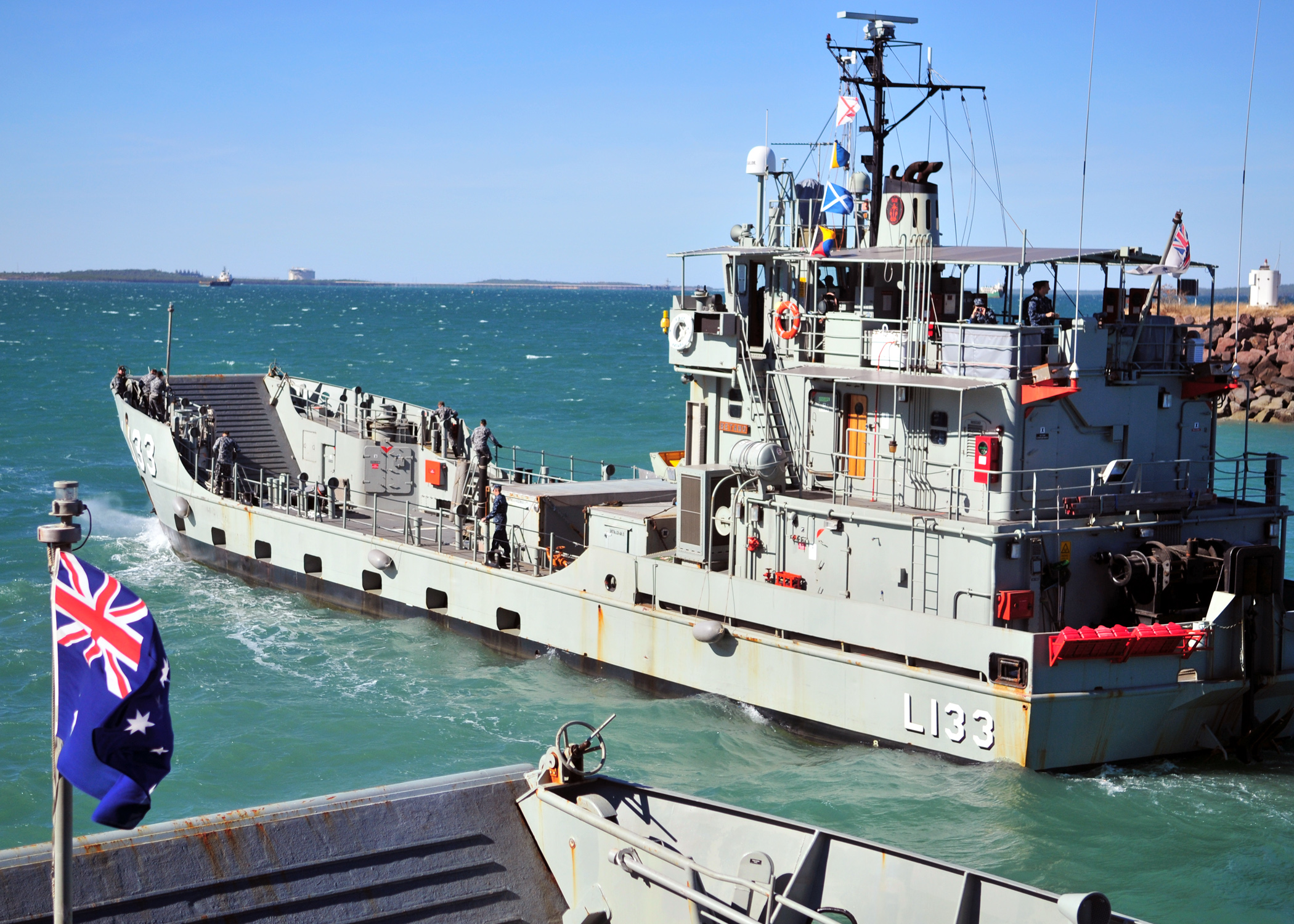
Betano leaving Darwin in 2011

On 11 December 2012, Wewak was decommissioned. Balikpapan and Betano were both decommissioned a day later, on 12 December. The other three Australian vessels were decommissioned on 19 November 2014.

=== Papua New Guinea ===
As part of the leadup to the independence of Papua New Guinea, in November 1974, Salamaua and Buna were transferred to the fledgling Papua New Guinea Defence Force, along with five Attack-class patrol boats.

During 1985 and 1986, Salamaua and Buna underwent refits.

The two PNG vessels were listed in Jane's Fighting Ships as non-operational since 2011, and awaiting refits. By 2013, they had been returned to service. Labuan and Tarakan delivered humanitarian supplies to remote coastal settlements in the Solomon Islands in September 2014 as part of Australian support efforts in the region.

After decommissioning from Australian service, Labuan was transferred to the PNGDF for use as a training vessel, and was commissioned as HMPNGS Lakekamu on 4 December 2014.

Salamaua was decommissioned from PNGDF service on 19 June 2020. Buna was decommissioned from PNGDF service in June 2021.

=== Philippines ===
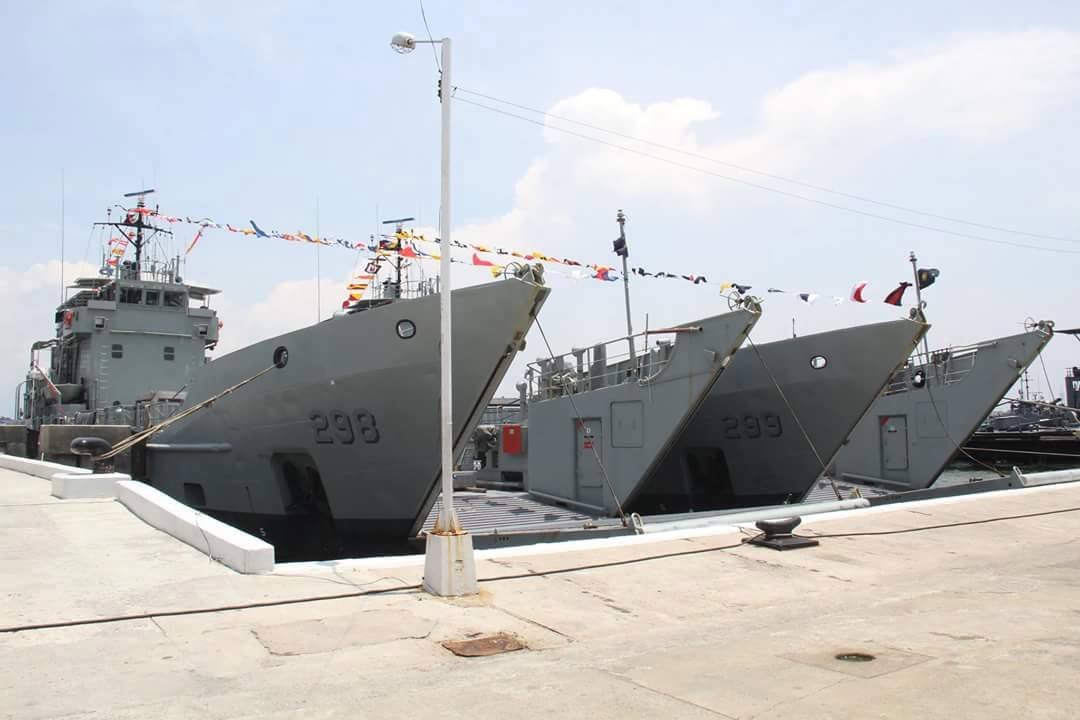
BRP Ivatan (left) and BRP Batak during the arrival ceremonies at Naval Base Cavite on 7 August 2015

Brunei and Tarakan were selected for donation to the Philippine Navy in January 2015. The intention was to improve the Philippines' sealift capability, which was found lacking following Typhoon Yolanda in 2013. The two landing craft were refurbished and fitted with new navigation and safety equipment, at a total cost of A$4 million. Hand-over of the vessel was originally planned for 17 May 2015, but this did not occur. Instead, the Philippine Navy took possession of the vessels at HMAS Cairns on 23 July, with Brunei commissioned as BRP Ivatan and Tarakan commissioned as BRP Batak. The two landing craft sailed that day for the Philippines, with a formal christening ceremony to be held following their arrival in early August. It has been reported that the vessels will likely be homeported on the island of Palawan.

The Philippine and Australian governments are in negotiations to sell the three remaining Australian Balikpapans to the Philippine Navy, with a deal expected to be reached later in 2015. On 27 July 2015, Philippines president Benigno Aquino III stated as part of his annual state of the nation address that his government intended to purchase all three vessels. All three, the former HMAS Balikpapan, HMAS Wewak, and HMAS Betano, were delivered to the Philippines in March 2016, and were immediately sent for refurbishing works. The Philippines paid ₱270 million for the three vessels. They will be commissioned to the Philippine Navy on 1 June 2016 as BRP Waray, BRP Iwak, and BRP Agta, and will be assigned to the Sealift Amphibious Force.

== Ships of the class ==
Prefix	Name	Pennant	Commissioned	Decommissioned	Fate
Royal Australian Navy
HMAS	Balikpapan	L126	8 December 1971	12 December 2012	Transferred to the Philippine Navy as BRP Agta
HMAS	Brunei	L127	5 January 1973	20 November 2014	Transferred to the Philippine Navy as BRP Ivatan
HMAS	Labuan	L128	9 March 1973	20 November 2014	Transferred to Papua New Guinea as HMPNGS Lakekamu
HMAS	Tarakan	L129	12 June 1973	20 November 2014	Transferred to the Philippine Navy as BRP Batak
HMAS	Wewak	L130	10 August 1973	11 December 2012	Transferred to the Philippine Navy as BRP Iwak
HMAS	Salamaua	L131	19 October 1973	14 November 1974	Transferred to Papua New Guinea as HMPNGS Salamaua
HMAS	Buna	L132	7 December 1973	14 November 1974	Transferred to Papua New Guinea as HMPNGS Buna
HMAS	Betano	L133	8 February 1974	12 December 2012	Transferred to the Philippine Navy as BRP Waray
Papua New Guinea Maritime Element
HMPNGS	Buna	L32	14 November 1974	28 June 2021	Retired
HMPNGS	Salamaua	L33	14 November 1974	19 June 2020	Retired
HMPNGS	Lakekamu	L33	4 December 2014		In active service
Philippine Navy
BRP	Ivatan	LC-298	23 July 2015		Part of the Sealift Amphibious Force
BRP	Batak	LC-299	23 July 2015		Part of the Sealift Amphibious Force
BRP	Waray	LC-288	1 June 2016		Part of the Sealift Amphibious Force
BRP	Iwak	LC-289	1 June 2016		Part of the Sealift Amphibious Force
BRP	Agta	LC-290	1 June 2016		Part of the Sealift Amphibious Force

== Replacement ==
There are plans to replace the Balikpapans in Australian service with an as-yet-unidentified class of six heavy landing craft. The original replacement project was not due to decide on the design until between 2016 and 2018, with the new class to enter service from 2022. This has now changed to some point in the late 2020s under LAND8710, with the ships to once again be operated by the Australian Army. A total of 18 "Landing Craft - Medium" of around 500 tonnes like the Balikpapans and 8 "Landing Craft - Heavy" of around 3,900 tonnes are to be acquired.
