= HMAS Betano =

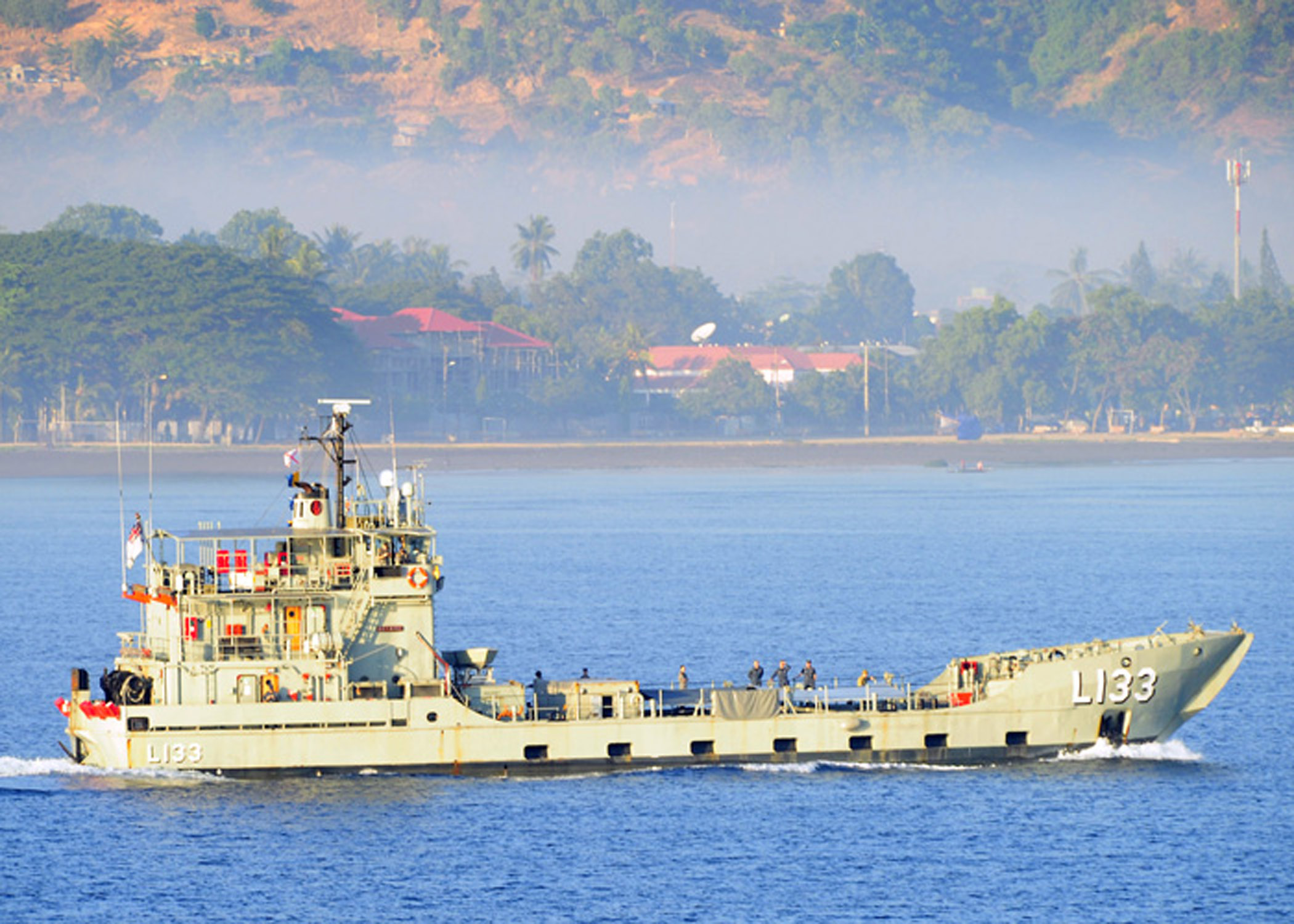
- HMAS Betano in June 2011

History

Australia
- Builder: Walkers Limited
- Laid down: September 1972
- Launched: 5 December 1972
- Commissioned: 8 February 1974
- Decommissioned: 12 December 2012
- Home port: HMAS Coonawarra
- Motto: "Bravely In Difficulties"
- Honours and awards: Battle honours: East Timor 2000
- Status: Awaiting disposal
- Badge

General characteristics
- Class & type: Balikpapan-class landing craft heavy
- Displacement: 316 tons
- Length: 44.5 m (146 ft)
- Beam: 10.1 m (33 ft)
- Propulsion: Two GE diesels
- Speed: 9 knots (17 km/h; 10 mph)
- Capacity: 180 tons of vehicle cargo or 400 soldiers
- Complement: 13
- Armament: 2 × 0.50 inch machine guns

HMAS Betano (L 133) was a Balikpapan-class heavy landing craft operated by the Royal Australian Navy (RAN).

== Design and construction ==
The eight-vessel Balikpapan class was ordered as a locally manufactured replacement for the Australian Army's LSM-1-class landing ship medium and ALC 50 landing craft. They are 44.5 metres (146 ft) long, with a beam of 10.1 metres (33 ft), and a draught of 1.9 metres (6 ft 3 in). The landing craft have a standard displacement of 316 tons, with a full load displacement of 503 tons. They are propelled by two G.M. Detroit 6-71 diesel motors, providing 675 brake horsepower to the two propeller shafts, allowing the vessels to reach 9 knots (17 km/h; 10 mph). The standard ship's company is 13-strong. The Balikpapans are equipped with a Decca RM 916 navigational radar, and fitted with two 7.62 millimetres (0.300 in) machine guns for self-defence.

The LCHs have a maximum payload of 180 tons; equivalent to 3 Leopard 1 tanks, 13 M113 armoured personnel carriers, 23 quarter-tonne trucks, or four LARC-V amphibious cargo vehicles. As a troop transport, a Balikpapan-class vessel can transport up to 400 soldiers between a larger amphibious ship and the shore, or embark 60 soldiers in six-berth caravans for longer voyages. The vessel's payload affects the range: at 175 tons of cargo, each vessel has a range of 1,300 nautical miles (2,400 km; 1,500 mi), which increases to 2,280 nautical miles (4,220 km; 2,620 mi) with a 150-ton payload, and 3,000 nautical miles (5,600 km; 3,500 mi) when unladen. The flat, box-like keel causes the ships to roll considerably in other-than-calm conditions, limiting their ability to make long voyages.

Betano was laid down by Walkers Limited at Maryborough, Queensland on 3 October 1972, launched on 12 December 1972, and commissioned into the RAN on 8 February 1974.

== Operational history ==
In April 1974, Betano, Buna, and Brunei transited to Lord Howe Island as a demonstration of the Balikpanan class' oceangoing capabilities.

Following the destruction of Darwin by Cyclone Tracy during the night of 24–25 December 1974, Betano was deployed as part of the relief effort; Operation Navy Help Darwin. Betano sailed from Brisbane on 26 December.

From 1985 to 1988, Betano and Brunei were assigned to the Australian Hydrographic Officer and operated as survey ships in the waters of northern Australia and Papua New Guinea.

The ship was deployed to East Timor as part of the Australian-led INTERFET peacekeeping taskforce from 19 January to 19 February 2000. Her service earned her the battle honour "East Timor 2000".

== Decommissioning and fate ==
Betano was decommissioned at Darwin on 12 December 2012. The Philippine Navy has shown interest in acquiring the ship after the Australian government donated two sister ships, HMAS Brunei and HMAS Tarakan in 2015. It was later confirmed that the Philippine Navy will acquire three more LCHs from Australia, including ex-HMAS Betano, at a token price.

== Sources ==
Books

- Gillett, Ross (1988). Australian and New Zealand Warships Since 1946. Brookvale, New South Wales: Child & Associates. ISBN 0-86777-219-0. OCLC 23470364.
- Stevens, David (2007). Strength Through Diversity: The Combined Naval Role in Operation Stabilise (PDF). Working Papers. Vol. 20. Canberra: Sea Power Centre - Australia. ISBN 978-0-642-29676-4. ISSN 1834-7231. Archived from the original (PDF) on 10 September 2012.
- Wertheim, Eric, ed. (2007). The Naval Institute Guide to Combat Fleets of the World: Their Ships, Aircraft, and Systems (15th ed.). Annapolis, Maryland: Naval Institute Press. ISBN 978-1-59114-955-2. OCLC 140283156.

Journal articles

- "Disaster Relief — Cyclone Tracy and Tasman Bridge". Semaphore. 2004 (14). Sea Power Centre. December 2004. Archived from the original on 13 February 2009.
- Swinden, Greg (April 2013). "Heavy Lifting for Four Decades: The Navy's Landing Craft Heavy". The Navy. 75 (2). Navy League of Australia: 20–24. ISSN 1322-6231.
