= Operation Navy Help Darwin =

Australian disaster relief operation

Operation Navy Help Darwin was a disaster relief operation initiated by the Royal Australian Navy (RAN) following the destruction of Darwin, Northern Territory by Cyclone Tracy during the night of 24–25 December 1974. 13 ships, 11 aircraft, and 3,000 personnel were sent to Darwin in the largest disaster relief operation undertaken by the RAN in its history. The RAN task force was present from 31 December 1974 to 31 January 1975.

== Cyclone Tracy ==
Cyclone Tracy made landfall in the early hours of 25 December 1974. Darwin was destroyed: only 408 of the city's 10,000 structures remained undamaged. 49 people ashore were killed, along with 14 civilians on vessels in the harbour and nearby waters.

Of the RAN assets in Darwin, the Naval Headquarters was destroyed, as were large sections of the patrol boat base and the married quarters. The oil fuel supply installation and naval communications station at HMAS Coonawarra were also damaged. Four Attack-class patrol boats were based in Darwin; Advance and Assail were able to weather the cyclone with minor damage, but Attack was forced aground, and Arrow sank after colliding with Stokes Hill Wharf, killing two personnel and bringing the death toll to 65.

== RAN response ==
=== Deployment ===
As the scope of the disaster became known, the RAN began to assemble a task force under the command of Flag Officer Commanding Australian Fleet, Rear Admiral David_Wells_(admiral). All personnel on annual leave were recalled; the vast majority responding before their ship sailed, while ships' companies were filled out by volunteers from shore bases and the ships unable to sail. Hundreds of tons of relief stores were embarked for transport.

The first RAN units to arrive in Darwin were two HS 748 aircraft from 851 Squadron RAN on 26 December; one carrying Red Cross members and blood transfusion equipment, the other transporting Clearance Diving Team 1 (CDT1). That day, HMA Ships Balikpapan and Betano departed from Brisbane, HMAS Flinders sailed from Cairns, while Melbourne (with Rear Admiral Wells aboard), Brisbane, and Stuart left Sydney. On 27 December, Hobart, Stalwart, Supply, and Vendetta left Sydney, while Brunei and Tarakan sailed from Brisbane. The last ship, Wewak, left Brisbane on 2 January. Between the 13 ships, 3,000 personnel were deployed on the operation.

The survey ship Flinders and the destroyer Brisbane were the first ships to arrive in Darwin, on 31 December. Flinders was tasked with surveying the harbour to work out the position of wrecks and the safest areas for the other RAN ships to anchor, while Brisbane established contact with the Emergency Services Organisation Committee running relief efforts in Darwin. A further eight ships arrived between 1 and 4 January, and Brunei, Tarakan, and Wewak reached Darwin on 13 January.

Four S-2 Tracker aircraft were placed on standby to fly to Darwin, but were later stood down. It was also planned to send the British submarine HMS Odin, which was on loan to the RAN Submarine Squadron, for use as a power station, but there were no power adaption facilities in Darwin suitable for connecting Odin's two diesel generators to the electricity grid.

=== Work performed ===
The initial RAN relief which was limited to search and rescue in the area of Darwin Harbour and Melville Island, which was hindered by the lack of reliable communications.

As the ships of the task force arrived, naval working parties were assigned to clear the suburbs of Nightcliff, Rapid Creek, and Casuarina. From 1 to 30 January, naval personnel spent 17,979-man days ashore, with up to 1,200 personnel ashore at any time. They cleared and restored 1,593 properties, along with schools and government buildings, disposed of spoiled food, installed generators, and repaired electrical networks. Other sailors were involved in more unusual jobs, some working parties were tasked with saving rare plants from the Darwin Botanic Gardens, while one sailor filled in at a radio station as a disc jockey.

CDT1 inspected vessels in the harbour for damage, searched for sunken ships, and cleared the waters around the wharves at Stokes Hill and Fort Hill wharves. After the main task force arrived, the divers focused on recovering the wrecked patrol boat Arrow.

Nine Westland Wessex helicopters embarked aboard Melbourne and Stalwart transported 7,832 passengers and 110,912 kilograms (244,519 lb) of supplies. The two HS 748s were used to shuttle supplies north and survivors south. During their 14 return flights to Darwin, they carried 485 passengers and 22,680 kilograms (50,000 lb) of freight. Some of the evacuees were temporarily housed in naval bases around Sydney and Brisbane.

=== Departure ===
The RAN ships began a staggered withdrawal from 7 January. Operation Navy Help Darwin was concluded on 30 January 1975, when command of the relief effort was handed over to the Commandant of the Australian Army's 7th Military District with Brisbane and Stalwart sailing for home the next day.

== Aftermath ==
Navy Help Darwin was the largest disaster relief operation ever undertaken by the RAN.

During May and June 1975, the minehunters Curlew, Ibis, and Snipe undertook a detailed survey of Darwin Harbour to pinpoint all of the vessels sunk by the cyclone.
