= BRP Batak =

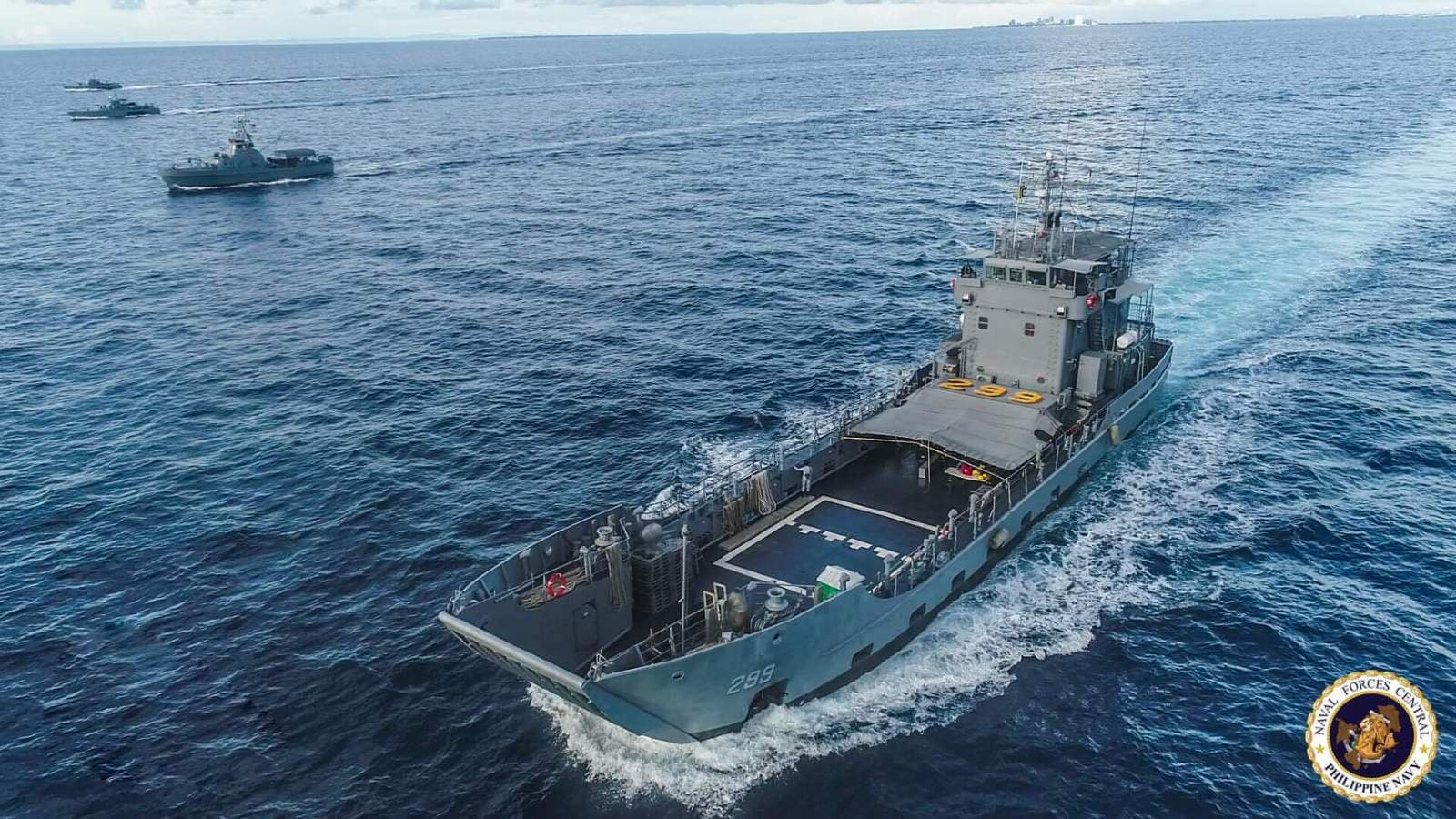
- BRP Batak with other Philippine Navy boats during Exercise Pagsasama 2021

History

Australia
- Decommissioned: 20 November 2014
- Motto: "Nothing Daunts"
- Nickname(s): 'trashcan'
- Fate: Transferred to the Philippine Navy, 23 July 2015

History

Philippines
- Name: BRP Batak
- Namesake: Batak people, a Filipino ethnic group located on Palawan
- Acquired: 23 July 2015
- Commissioned: 23 July 2015
- Status: Active as of 2015

General characteristics
- Class & type: Balikpapan-class landing craft heavy
- Displacement: 316 tons
- Length: 44.5 m (146 ft)
- Beam: 10.1 m (33 ft)
- Propulsion: Two GE diesels
- Speed: 9 knots (17 km/h; 10 mph)
- Capacity: 180 tons of vehicle cargo or 400 soldiers
- Complement: 13
- Armament: 2 × 0.50 inch machine guns

BRP Batak (LC-299) is a Balikpapan-class heavy landing craft operated by the Philippine Navy. One of eight vessels built by Walkers Limited for the Royal Australian Navy (RAN), the ship was commissioned into Australian service in 1973 as HMAS Tarakan (L 129) . During her RAN career, Tarakan (named after the Australian landing at Tarakan during World War II) was deployed post-Cyclone Tracy as part of Operation Navy Help Darwin, undertook various surveying operations, was placed in reserve between 1985 and 1988, relocated an overpopulation of Tridacna gigas clams, was part of the INTERFET peacekeeping taskforce, and participated in a Pacific Partnership humanitarian deployment.

Tarakan was decommissioned from Australian service in 2014. The ship was refurbished and donated to the Philippine Navy, commissioning as BRP Batak (AT-299) (named after the ethnic group of the same name) in 2015. The hull number was changed to LC-299 in April 2016 as the Philippine Navy started using a new ship classification standard.

== Design and construction ==
The eight-vessel Balikpapan class was ordered as a locally manufactured replacement for the Australian Army's LSM-1-class landing ship medium and ALC 50 landing craft. They are 44.5 metres (146 ft) long, with a beam of 10.1 metres (33 ft), and a draught of 1.9 metres (6 ft 3 in). The landing craft have a standard displacement of 316 tons, with a full load displacement of 503 tons. They were propelled by two G.M. Detroit 6–71 diesel motors, providing 675 brake horsepower to the two propeller shafts, allowing the vessels to reach 9 knots (17 km/h; 10 mph). The standard ship's company is 17-strong. The Balikpapans are equipped with a Decca RM 916 navigational radar, and fitted with two 12.7 millimetres (0.50 in) machine guns for self-defence.

The LCHs have a maximum payload of 180 tons; equivalent to 3 Leopard 1 tanks, 13 M113 armoured personnel carriers, 23 quarter-tonne trucks, or four LARC-V amphibious cargo vehicles. As a troop transport, a Balikpapan-class vessel can transport up to 400 soldiers between a larger amphibious ship and the shore, or embark 60 soldiers in six-berth caravans for longer voyages. The vessel's payload affects the range: at 175 tons of cargo, each vessel has a range of 1,300 nautical miles (2,400 km; 1,500 mi), which increases to 2,280 nautical miles (4,220 km; 2,620 mi) with a 150-ton payload, and 3,000 nautical miles (5,600 km; 3,500 mi) when unladen. The flat, box-like keel causes the ships to roll considerably in other-than-calm conditions, limiting their ability to make long voyages.

The ship was laid down by Walkers Limited at Maryborough, Queensland on 12 December 1971, launched on 16 March 1972 and commissioned into the RAN as HMAS Tarakan on 15 June 1973.

== Operational history ==
Following the destruction of Darwin by Cyclone Tracy during the night of 24/25 December 1974, Tarakan was deployed as part of the relief effort; Operation Navy Help Darwin. The ship sailed from Brisbane on 27 December, and arrived on 13 January.

In 1978, the LCH performed hydrographic surveys of Port Clinton, Queensland.

Tarakan was placed in reserve on 6 September 1985, one of three landing craft decommissioned for economic reasons. She was reactivated in 1988.

From May 1992 to April 1993, Tarakan was used by the Great Barrier Reef Marine Park Authority to relocate an overpopulation of Tridacna gigas clams from Orpheus Island to Grub Reef. Tarakan was seconded to Operation Beachcomber on several occasions between 1991 and 1995 for hydrographic duties.

In November 1997, Tarakan and Labuan delivered humanitarian supplies to drought-stricken areas in northern Papua New Guinea.

Tarakan was deployed to East Timor as part of the Australian-led INTERFET peacekeeping taskforce during 1999 and 2000. She was attached to INTERFET on two occasions; 30 October to 8 December 1999, and 13 January to 16 February 2000. Following an overhaul of the RAN battle honours system, concluded in March 2010, Tarakan was awarded the honour "East Timor 1999–2000" for these deployments. Tarakan and sister ship Balikpapan returned to East Timor in May 2006 as part of Operation Astute. Tarakan also deployed numerous times in support of Operation Bel Isi II (Peace Monitoring Group on Bougainville) and Operation Anode (Regional Assistance Mission to the Solomon Islands).

In 2010, Tarakan and Labuan participated in the Pacific Partnership humanitarian deployment. During June and July 2012, Tarakan was used to move personnel and stores to remote communities to facilitate the 2012 Papua New Guinea election.

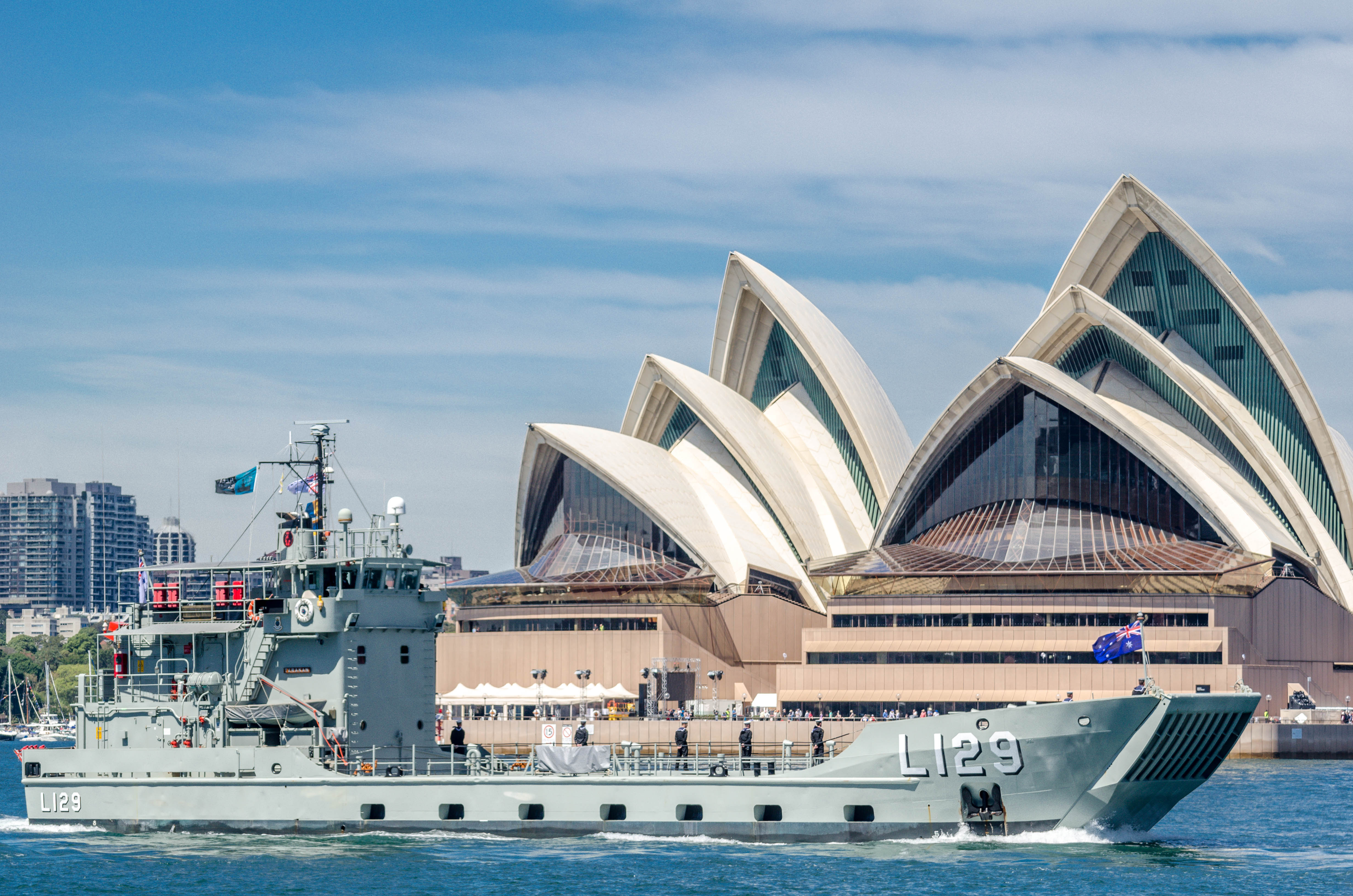
HMAS Tarakan during the 2013 International Fleet Review

In October 2013, Tarakan participated in the International Fleet Review 2013 in Sydney.

After participating in Exercise Croix Du Sud off New Caledonia, Labuan and Tarakan delivered humanitarian supplies to remote coastal settlements in the Solomon Islands in September 2014 as part of Australian support efforts in the region.

L129 made an appearance in the movie The Thin Red Line.

== Decommissioning ==
Tarakan, along with Labuan and Brunei, were decommissioned on 20 November 2014.

Tarakan and sister ship Brunei were selected for donation to the Philippine Navy in January 2015. The intention was to improve the Philippines' sealift capability, which was found lacking following Typhoon Yolanda in 2013. The two landing craft were refurbished and fitted with new navigation and safety equipment, at a total cost of A$4 million. Hand-over of the vessel was originally planned for 17 May 2015, but this did not occur.

Instead, the Philippine Navy took possession of the vessels at HMAS Cairns on 23 July, with Tarakan commissioning into the Philippine Navy as BRP Batak (AT-299). The two landing craft sailed that day for the Philippines, with a formal christening ceremony to be held following their arrival in early August.

== Gallery ==
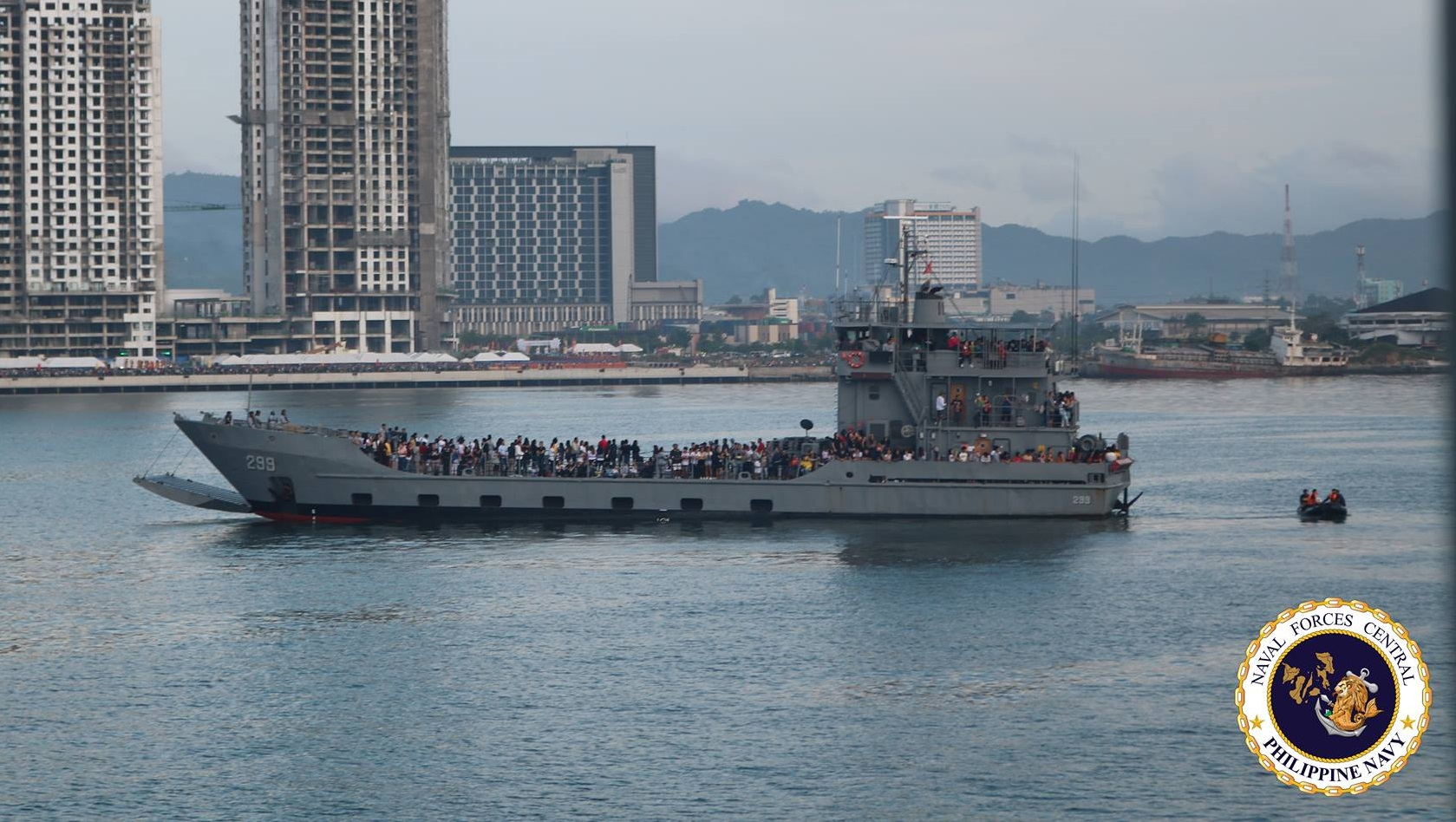
BRP Batak at the Cebu Sinulog fluvial festival 2019

== See also ==
- List of ships of the Philippine Navy
