= HMAS Brunei =

1971 Balikpapan-class landing craft heavy

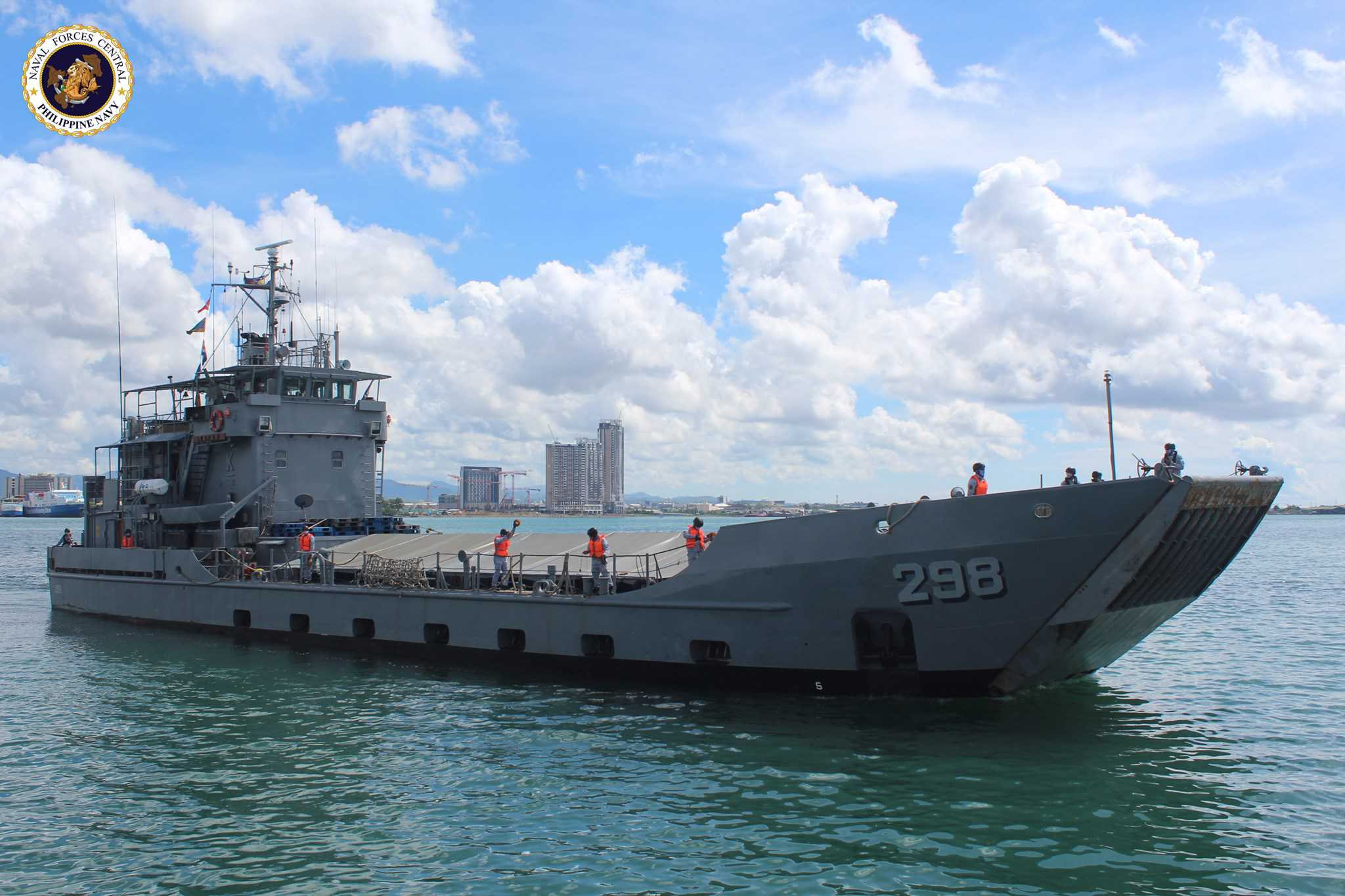
- BRP Ivatan arriving at Captain Veloso Pier

History

Australia
- Name: HMAS Brunei
- Namesake: Landings at Brunei Bay (Battle of North Borneo)
- Builder: Walkers Limited (Maryborough, Queensland)
- Laid down: 9 August 1971
- Launched: 8 October 1971
- Commissioned: 5 January 1973
- Decommissioned: 20 November 2014
- Home port: HMAS Cairns
- Identification: Call sign: VKDK
- Motto: "Attempt to Attain"
- Honours and awards: Battle honours: East Timor 1999–2000
- Fate: Transferred to the Philippine Navy, 23 July 2015
- Badge

History

Philippines
- Name: BRP Ivatan
- Namesake: Ivatan people, a Filipino ethnic group predominant in the Batanes Islands
- Acquired: 23 July 2015
- Commissioned: 23 July 2015
- Status: Active as of 2015

General characteristics
- Class & type: Balikpapan-class landing craft heavy
- Displacement: 316 tons
- Length: 44.5 m (146 ft)
- Beam: 10.1 m (33 ft)
- Propulsion: Two GE diesels
- Speed: 9 knots (17 km/h; 10 mph)
- Capacity: 180 tons of vehicle cargo or 400 soldiers
- Complement: 13
- Armament: 2 × 0.50 inch machine guns

BRP Ivatan (LC-298) is a Balikpapan-class heavy landing craft operated by the Philippine Navy. One of eight vessels built by Walkers Limited for the Royal Australian Navy (RAN), the ship was commissioned into Australian service in 1973 as HMAS Brunei (L 127). During her RAN career, Brunei (named after the amphibious landings at Brunei Bay during the World War II Battle of North Borneo) visited Lord Howe Island, was deployed post-Cyclone Tracy as part of Operation Navy Help Darwin, performed coastal surveys of northern Australia and Papua New Guinea, and served as part of the INTERFET peacekeeping taskforce.

Brunei was decommissioned from Australian service in 2014. The ship was refurbished and donated to the Philippine Navy, commissioning as BRP Ivatan (named after the Ivatan ethnic group) in 2015.

== Design and construction ==
The eight-vessel Balikpapan class was ordered as a locally manufactured replacement for the Australian Army's LSM-1-class landing ship medium and ALC 50 landing craft. They are 44.5 metres (146 ft) long, with a beam of 10.1 metres (33 ft), and a draught of 1.9 metres (6 ft 3 in). The landing craft have a standard displacement of 316 tons, with a full load displacement of 503 tons. They are propelled by two G.M. Detroit 6–71 diesel motors, providing 675 brake horsepower to the two propeller shafts, allowing the vessels to reach 9 knots (17 km/h; 10 mph). The standard ship's company is 13-strong. The Balikpapans are equipped with a Decca RM 916 navigational radar, and fitted with two 7.62 millimetres (0.300 in) machine guns for self-defence.

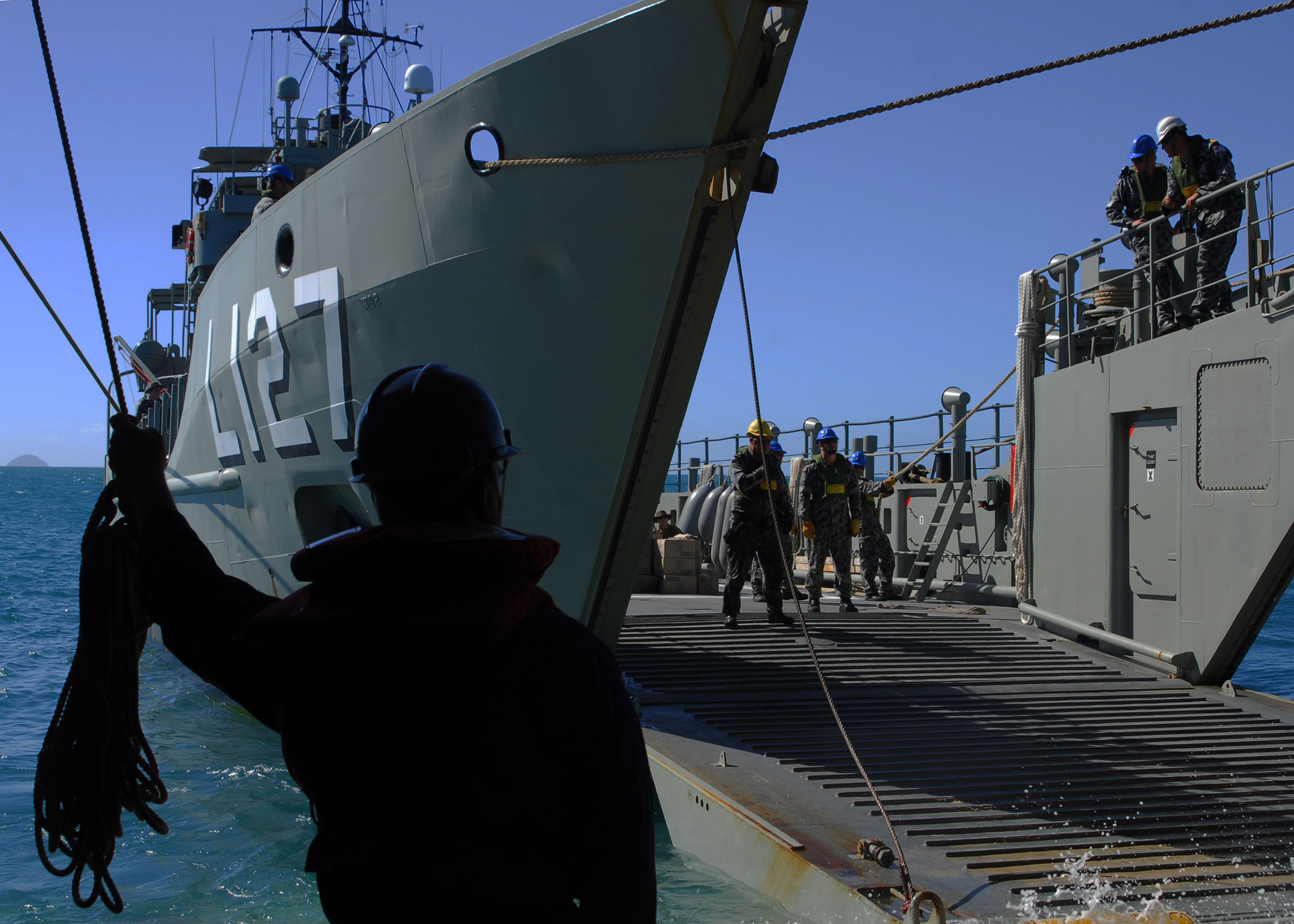
HMAS Brunei's bow ramp open on the stern gate of USS Denver during Exercise Talisman Sabre 2009

The LCHs have a maximum payload of 180 tons; equivalent to 3 Leopard 1 tanks, 13 M113 armoured personnel carriers 23 quarter-tonne trucks, or four LARC-V amphibious cargo vehicles. As a troop transport, a Balikpapan-class vessel can transport up to 400 soldiers between a larger amphibious ship and the shore, or embark 60 soldiers in six-berth caravans for longer voyages. The vessel's payload affects the range: at 175 tons of cargo, each vessel has a range of 1,300 nautical miles (2,400 km; 1,500 mi), which increases to 2,280 nautical miles (4,220 km; 2,620 mi) with a 150-ton payload, and 3,000 nautical miles (5,600 km; 3,500 mi) when unladen. The flat, box-like keel causes the ships to roll considerably in other-than-calm conditions, limiting their ability to make long voyages.

The ship was laid down by Walkers Limited at Maryborough, Queensland on 9 August 1971, launched on 8 October 1971, and commissioned into the RAN as HMAS Brunei on 5 January 1973.

== Operational history ==
In April 1974, Brunei, Buna, and Betano transited to Lord Howe Island as a demonstration of the Balikpanan class' oceangoing capabilities.

Following the destruction of Darwin by Cyclone Tracy during the night of 24–25 December 1974, Brunei was deployed as part of the relief effort; Operation Navy Help Darwin. Brunei sailed from Brisbane on 27 December, and arrived on 13 January 1975.

From 1985 to 1988, Brunei and Betano were assigned to the Australian Hydrographic Office and operated as survey ships in the waters of northern Australian and Papua New Guinea.

Brunei was deployed to East Timor as part of the Australian-led INTERFET peacekeeping taskforce during 1999 and 2000. She was attached to INTERFET on three occasions; 20 September to 17 November 1999, 8 December 1999 to 15 January 2000, and 15 to 23 February 2000. The ship was later awarded the battle honour "East Timor 1999–2000" for these deployments. Brunei also operated in support of UNTAET between 2000 and 2002.

In 2006, Brunei visited Lord Howe Island for the 75th anniversary of the first solo Australia to New Zealand flight by Sir Francis Chichester.

== Decommissioning ==
Brunei, along with Labuan and Tarakan, were decommissioned on 20 November 2014.

Brunei and sister ship Tarakan were selected for donation to the Philippine Navy in January 2015. The intention was to improve the Philippines' sealift capability, which was found lacking following Typhoon Yolanda in 2013. The two landing craft were refurbished and fitted with new navigation and safety equipment, at a total cost of A$4 million. Hand-over of the vessel was originally planned for 17 May 2015, but this did not occur. Instead, the Philippine Navy took possession of the vessels at HMAS Cairns on 23 July, with Brunei commissioning into the Philippine Navy as BRP Ivatan. The two landing craft sailed that day for the Philippines, with a formal christening ceremony to be held following their arrival in early August.

== See also ==
- List of ships of the Philippine Navy
