= ALC 50 =

Class overview
- Builders: Phoenix Shipyards, Devonport
- Operators: Australian Army
- Succeeded by: Balikpapan class
- Built: 1960
- Completed: 2
- Active: 0

General characteristics
- Type: Landing Craft Utility
- Displacement: 145 tons at full load
- Length: 79.9 ft (24.4 m)
- Beam: 24 ft (7.3 m)
- Propulsion: Four Detroit Diesel Series 71 engines
- Speed: 8 knots (15 km/h)
- Range: 1,130 mi (1,820 km)
- Capacity: 1 × Centurion tank, or; 100 infantrymen, or; 40,000 gallons of bulk fuel
- Complement: Eight
- Notes: Ship characteristics from Gillett (1988), p. 117

The Australian Landing Craft 50 or ALC 50 was a class of Landing Craft Utility operated by the Australian Army in the 1960s.

== History ==
The two ALC 50s were built by Phoenix Shipyards in Devonport, Tasmania and were completed in 1962 and collected for sea trials and transfer to Sydney early that year. The operating unit that accepted and ran them both was 4 Water Transport Troop, Clifton Gardens, Middle Head, Sydney. The commander and trial officer for both the trial-cum-voyage back to Sydney of the first vessel to be launched in early 1962 was Lieut. Don McDowell.

The voyage was not without difficulty and sailing through the aftermath of a gale caused conditions that saw th bow door start to "peel" externally, some engine troubles that caused a close-down on one side, one rudder pintle breaking, and the helm-wheel shake to pieces leaving only its steel skeleton. Eventually the vessel had to get towed to Sydney by the accompanying LSM, and attaching the towing bridle in heavy seas resulted in an accident that injured two of the six crew. This unhappy voyage ended with the vessel coming into Sydney Harbour with distress flags/balls hoisted, having to steer in a slow circle to port then a short burst of full astern, in an attempt to get it to dock alongside Clifton Gardens base. That the vessel was largely orange with rust by this time (and no longer bronze deep green) also did little to impress the official greeting party as news of the vessels mishaps had not been passed because of radio failure during the voyage. Despite such an eventful maiden voyage, that vessel was fixed in 4 Water Transport's own workshops and all faults repaired, leaving it to go into honourable service as shown below.

During their service with the Army they were named AB 3000 and AB 3001 and operated along the NSW and QLD coastline on army exercises. In September 1970 an ALC 50, in company with a pair of LCM8s, travelled some 880 kilometers up the Sepik River to the PNG-West Irian border. The ALC 50s were replaced by the Balikpapan-class landing craft heavy in the early 1970s.
