= List of museums in New South Wales =

This is list of museums in New South Wales, Australia. Museums are defined for this context as institutions that collect and care for objects of cultural, artistic, scientific, or historical interest and make their collections or related exhibits available for public viewing. Non-profit art galleries, university art galleries, other non-profit organisations, government entities, and private businesses are included.

According to the 2013 NSW Museum and Gallery Sector Census and Survey conducted by Museums & Galleries of NSW, a state funded support agency, there were 495 operational museums and galleries located in NSW in that year. They include 293 community-run and -managed museums, 57 public and regional galleries, 51 public and regional museums, 37 community-run and -managed galleries and artist run initiatives and 23 Aboriginal cultural centres. The balance of the identified organisations were state or national galleries or museums located in NSW. It does not include private museums or commercial galleries.

Museums & Galleries of NSW provides a complete list and profiles for these institutions on their website.

For a list of publicly funded regional galleries, refer to Regional and Public Galleries Association of New South Wales.

== Museums ==
Name	Location	Area	Type	Summary
12th/16th Hunter River Lancers Memorial Museum	Muswellbrook	Hunter Valley	Military	information, history of the 12th/16th Hunter River Lancers May be closed. See for further information.
Abercrombie House	Bathurst	Central Tablelands	Historic house	50-room Scottish-baronial mansion of the 1870s
ACU McGlade Gallery at Strathfield	Strathfield	Inner West	Art	Part of Australian Catholic University
Age of Fishes Museum	Canowindra	Central West	Natural history	Devonian fish fossils and a live aquarium
Albert Kersten Mining & Minerals Museum	Broken Hill	Western Plains	Geology	website, rocks, minerals, area's geology, earth sciences of mineralogy and metallurgy
Albury Art Gallery	Albury	Riverina	Art	website
Albury Library Museum	Albury	Riverina	Local history	Combined library and museum of local history and art
Alison Homestead	Wyong	Central Coast	Local history	website, operated by the Wyong District Museum & Historical Society, pioneer homestead displays
Armidale and Region Aboriginal Cultural Centre and Keeping Place	Armidale	Northern Tablelands	Ethnic	website, includes an art gallery, exhibits about history and culture
Armidale Bicentennial Railway Museum	Armidale	Northern Tablelands	Railway	website
Armidale Folk Museum	Armidale	Northern Tablelands	Local history	website
Australian Army Infantry Museum	Singleton	Hunter Valley	Military	website, history of the Royal Australian Infantry Corps
Australian Country Music Hall of Fame	Tamworth	New England	Music	website
Australian Fossil and Mineral Museum	Bathurst	Central Tablelands	Geology	Fossils, minerals
Australian Motorlife Museum	Wollongong	Illawarra	Automotive	website, vintage cars and memorabilia
Australian Museum of Clothing and Textiles	East Maitland	Hunter Valley	Textile	information Located in the Maitland Gaol
Australian Pen Museum	Wagga Wagga	Riverina	Literary	information, writing implements, documents and associated items
Australian Road Transport Heritage Centre	Gundagai	Cootamunda-Gundagai	Transport	website
Ballina Naval & Maritime Museum	Ballina	Northern Rivers	Maritime	website, features original Las Balsas raft, ship models, steam and diesel engines, maritime communication, uniforms, shipbuilding, life on a ship
Bathurst District Historical Society Museum	Bathurst	Central Tablelands	Local history	website
Bathurst Rail Museum	Bathurst			website
Bathurst Regional Art Gallery	Bathurst	Central Tablelands	Art	website, municipal art gallery
Bedervale	Braidwood	Southern Tablelands	Historic house	Operated by the National Trust of Australia, 19th century homestead, open by appointment
Berry Museum (Australia)	Berry	South Coast	Local history	website, operated by the Berry & District Historical Society
Bega Valley Regional Gallery	Bega	South Coast	Art	Showcases contemporary Australian visual culture with up to ten exhibitions annually
Big Fish Fossil Hut	Peak Hill	Central West	Natural history	website, fossils including trilobites, ammonites, fish, amphibians and dinosaurs
Bishop's Lodge	Hay	Riverina	Historic house	website, 1888 iron house and rose garden
Blacktown Arts Centre	Blacktown	Western Sydney	Art	website
Bulli Black Diamond Districts Heritage Centre	Bulli			website
Blue Mountains Cultural Centre	Katoomba	Blue Mountains	Art	website
Braidwood Museum	Braidwood	Southern Tablelands	Local history	website
Breakwater Battery Military Museum	Port Kembla	Illawarra	Military	WW2 battery and observation post
Broken Hill Regional Art Gallery	Broken Hill	Western Plains	Art	website
Bundanon	Nowra	South Coast	Art	Historic homestead and studio of painter Arthur Boyd
Bunker Cartoon Gallery	Coffs Harbour	Mid North Coast	Art	website, works by Australian cartoonists and caricaturists
Bygone Beautys Treasured Teapot Museum	Leura	Blue Mountains	Art	website
Camden Haven Historical Museum	Laurieton	Mid North Coast	local history	operated by the Camden Haven Historical Society, in 1911 School of Arts building, historic exhibitions and artefacts, family history and research
Campbelltown Arts Centre	Campbelltown	South Western Sydney	Art	Regional art centre for multidisciplinary contemporary art
Campbelltown Steam & Machinery Museum	Campbelltown	South Western Sydney	Automotive	website
Canowindra Motors Holden Museum	Canowindra	Central West	Automotive	information, large collection of vintage Holden cars, including a 1948 FX Holden
Casula Powerhouse Arts Centre	Casula	South Western Sydney	Art	Performing and visual arts centre, includes 6 galleries with a year-round exhibition program of changing exhibitions and a theatre
Centenary Cottage Museum	Tenterfield	Northern Tablelands	Local history	information, information, operated by the Tenterfield and District Historical Society
Cessnock Regional Art Gallery	Cessnock	Hunter Valley	Art	information, Facebook site
Chifley Home	Bathurst	Central Tablelands	Historic house	website, home of Australian Prime Minister Ben Chifley and his wife, Elizabeth
Chrystie's Museum	Tocumwal	Riverina	Automotive	website, private collection of cars, trucks, tractors, caravans
City of Canada Bay Museum	Concord	Inner West	Local history	Collections include toys, material from the WW1 and WW2, household, sports memorabilia, local industry items
Coffs Harbour Regional Gallery	Coffs Harbour	Mid North Coast	Art	website
Coffs Harbour Regional Museum	Coffs Harbour	Mid North Coast	Local history	website
Coolamon Fire Museum	Coolamon	Riverina	Firefighting	website, private collection of firefighting memorabilia
Cooma Cottage	Yass	Southern Tablelands	Historic house	Operated by the National Trust of Australia, 19th century homestead and stables
Cowra and District Historical Museum	Cowra	Central West	Multiple	information, WWI and WWII military camp displays and armoury, working oil and steam engines, agriculture equipment
Cowra Regional Art Gallery	Cowra	Central West	Art	website
Day Dream Mine	Silverton		Mining	website, underground and surface mine tours
Dobell House	Wangi Wangi	Hunter Region	Art	website, home and studio of Sir William Dobell
Don Bank Museum	North Sydney	North Shore	Local history	information
Dorrigo and Guy Fawkes Museum	Dorrigo	Mid North Coast	Local history	information, operated by the Dorrigo and Guy Fawkes Historical Society
Dorrigo Steam Railway & Museum	Dorrigo	Mid North Coast	Railway	Collection of railway vehicles and equipment from the railways of New South Wales, not yet open to the public
Dundullimal Homestead	Dubbo	Orana	Historic house	1840s slab hut house, operated by the National Trust of Australia
Dunera Museum	Hay	Riverina	Military	website, history of the local prisoner of war and internment camps in World War II
Eden Killer Whale Museum	Eden	South Coast	Maritime	Australian whaling industry, maritime and fishing artifacts, timber industry and local social history
Elizabeth Bay House	Elizabeth Bay		Historic house	website
Elizabeth Farm	Parramatta	Greater Western Sydney	Historic house	Operated by the Sydney Living Museums, homestead dating back to 1793
Energy Expo at Mount Piper Power Station	Portland	Central Tablelands	Science	website, how electricity is produced and tours of the Mount Piper Power Station
Eryldene	Gordon	North Shore	Historic house	Early 20th-century house and garden with original furnishings
Esbank House	Lithgow	Blue Mountains	Historic house	website, 19th-century house with exhibits of local history, Lithgow pottery
Eugowra Historical Society Museum	Eugowra	Central West	Local history	information
Experiment Farm Cottage	Parramatta	Greater Western Sydney	Historic house	Operated by the National Trust of Australia, Australia's first European farmstead dating back to the 1790s
Fairfield City Museum and Gallery	Smithfield	South Western Sydney	Art	website
Fighter World	Williamtown	Hunter Region	Aerospace	website, Australian Fighter and aircraft related history, located at RAAF Base Williamtown
Fleet Air Arm Museum	Nowra	South Coast	Aerospace	Located on Naval Air Station Nowra, Australia's naval aviation history including aircraft and helicopters
Forbes Historical Museum	Forbes	Central West	Local history	website, operated by the Forbes and District Historical Society
Fort Scratchley	Newcastle East	Hunter Region	Military	Late 19th century coastal defence installation
Futureworld (New South Wales)	Warrawong	Illawarra	Science	website, hands-on exhibits about solutions to environmental challenges
Gallery Blackheath	Blackheath	Blue Mountains	Art	website, artist-owned and managed non-profit gallery showcasing a selection of fine paintings, drawings, printworks and photographs by prize-winning Blue Mountains artists
Garroorigang	Goulburn	Southern Tablelands	Historic house	website
Gill Bennet Gem and Mineral Collection	Tamworth	New England	Geology	information
Glasshouse Regional Gallery	Port Macquarie	Mid North Coast	Art	website
Glen Museum	Portland	Blue Mountains	Local history	website, formerly the Charlie Pinch Museum
Glenreagh Memorial Museum	Glenreagh	Northern Rivers	Local history	information
Glenreagh Mountain Railway	Glenreagh	Northern Rivers	Railway	Heritage railway
Golden Memories Museum	Millthorpe	Central West	Local history	information
Gosford Regional Gallery	Gosford	Central	Art	website
Goulburn Historic Waterworks Museum	Goulburn	Southern Tablelands	Technology	website, steam operated pumping facility with working engines
Goulburn Rail Heritage Centre	Goulburn	Southern Tablelands	Railway	Railroad roundhouse, includes rolling stock, locomotives, carriages, railroad artifacts
Goulburn Regional Art Gallery	Goulburn	Southern Tablelands	Art	website
Goulburn War Memorial & Museum	Goulburn	Southern Tablelands	Military	information, memorial tower and artefacts about WW1
Grafton Regional Gallery	Grafton	Northern Rivers	Art	website
Greater Cobar Heritage Centre	Cobar	Central West	Local history	website
Griffith Pioneer Park	Griffith	Riverina	Open air	website, relocated historic buildings, machinery and artefacts
Griffith Regional Art Gallery	Griffith	Riverina	Art	website
Grossman House	Maitland	Hunter Region	Historic house	website, operated by the National Trust of Australia, displays 19th century costumes and textiles
Gulgong Holtermann Museum	Gulgong	Central Tablelands	Local history	Community's history during the 1870s gold rush era
Hambledon Cottage	Parramatta	Greater Western Sydney	Historic house	website, operated by the Parramatta & District Historical Society, mid 19th century period cottage
Harper's Mansion	Berrima	Southern Highlands	Historic house	Operated by the National Trust of Australia, mid 19th century homestead
Harry Daly Museum	Edgecliff	Eastern Suburbs	Medical	website, history of anaesthetic practice, part of the Australian Society of Anaesthetists
HARS	Illawarra		Aviation Museum	https://hars.org.au
Hartley Historic Site	Hartley	Central West	Open air	Historic village administered by NSW Parks & Wildlife Service
Hawkesbury Regional Gallery	Windsor		Art	website
Hawkesbury Regional Museum	Windsor		Local history	website
Hay Gaol Museum	Hay	Riverina	Local history	Former prison with exhibits of local history
Hazelhurst Regional Gallery and Arts Centre	Gymea	Southern Sydney	Art	Arts centre that includes two art galleries, a theatrette, art studios, meeting rooms
Henry Kendall Cottage	Gosford	Central	Historic house	website, home of Henry Kendall (poet)
Henry Parks Centre	Parkes	Central West	Multiple	website, includes the King's Castle with a collection of Elvis Presley artefacts, Parkes Motor Museum, Henry Parkes Museum about local history, and antique machinery collection
Holbrook Submarine Museum	Holbrook	Murray	Local history and Australian Submarine history	https://www.visitgreaterhume.com.au/Featured-Content/History-and-Heritage/Museums/Holbrook-Submarine-Museum
Hillgrove Rural Life and Industry Museum	Armidale	Northern Tablelands	Local history	information, website, artifacts of everyday life in old Hillgrove
History Hill	Hill End	Central Tablelands	Mining	website, gold rush collection, mining equipment, underground mine
Hunter Valley Railway Trust	North Rothbury	Hunter Region	Railway	Includes rolling stock and locomotives
Hurstville Library Museum Gallery	Hurstville	Southern Sydney		website
Hyde Park Barracks	Sydney	Inner West		website
Illawarra Museum	Wollongong	Illawarra	Local history	website, operated by the Illawarra Historical Society
Illawarra Light Railway Museum	Albion Park	Illawarra	Railway	Includes mainline 2 ft (610 mm) narrow gauge light railway, a miniature 7 1/4 in (184 mm) gauge railway, and a museum
International Cricket Hall of Fame	Bowral	Southern Highlands	Sports	History of cricket, cricketing career of Australian batsman Sir Donald Bradman
Inverell Art Gallery	Inverell	Northern Tablelands	Art	website, community art gallery, operated by the Inverell Art Society
Inverell Pioneer Village	Inverell	Northern Tablelands	Open air	website, 19th-century pioneer village buildings
Junee Broadway Museum	Junee	Riverina	Local history	website, operated by the Junee & District Historical Society in the former Broadway Hotel
Junee Roundhouse Railway Museum	Junee	Riverina	Railway	Only working roundhouse railway station in the Riverina
Justice & Police Museum	Sydney	Inner West	History	website
Kangaroo Valley Pioneer Museum Park	Kangaroo Valley	South Coast	Open air	website, late 19th and early 20th century buildings, farm machinery, house and personal items
Lachlan Valley Railway	Cowra	Central West	Railway	Heritage railway and Cowra Roundhouse Depot and Museum
Lady Denman Heritage Complex	Huskisson	South Coast	Maritime	website, includes the 1911 Lady Denman ferry, surveying instruments, naval and maritime objects, local history displays, marine environment gallery
Lake Macquarie City Art Gallery	Lake Macquarie	Hunter Region	Art	website
Lambing Flat Folk Museum	Young	Central West	Local history	website
Lancer Barracks and Museum	Parramatta	Western Sydney	Military	website, located in Lancer Barracks
Lawrence Museum	Lawrence	Northern Rivers Region	Telecommunications	History of telecommunications and radio broadcasting in Australia
Leuralla Toy & Railway Museum	Leura	Blue Mountains	Toy	Toys, model trains and memorabilia
Lismore Regional Gallery	Lismore	Northern Rivers	Art	website
Lismore Regional Museum	Lismore	Northern Rivers	Local history	website, operated by the Richmond River Historical Society
Lithgow Small Arms Factory Museum	Lithgow	Blue Mountains	Technology	website, Lithgow Small Arms Factory history and collection of machine guns, rifles, pistols and related items from around the world
Lithgow State Mine Heritage Park & Railway	Lithgow	Blue Mountains	Mining	Coal mine buildings and equipment, railroad cars, equipment and track
Lock-Up Cultural Centre	Newcastle East	Hunter Region	Multiple	website, former police station with tours of the prison cells, a contemporary art gallery and artist residency
Luskintyre Aviation Flying Museum	Luskintyre	Hunter Region	Aerospace	Vintage aircraft, particularly de Havilland Tiger Moths
Mad Max Museum	Silverton		Media	website, memorabilia related to the film Mad Max 2
Maitland Gaol	East Maitland	Hunter Region	Prison	19th century prison, also features the Australian Museum of Clothing and Textiles
Maitland Regional Art Gallery	Maitland	Hunter Region	Art	website
Manly Art Gallery and Museum	Manly	Northern Beaches	Art	Focuses on Australian ceramics, and extensive holdings of paintings by Antonio Dattilo-Rubbo, local history
Manning Regional Art Gallery	Taree	Mid North Coast	Art	website
Manning Valley Historical Museum	Wingham	Mid North Coast	Local history	information, operated by the Manning Valley Historical Society
Mary MacKillop Place	North Sydney	North Shore	Religious	website, shrine and museum about Mary MacKillop, also known as Saint Mary of the Cross
May Gibbs’ Nutcote	Neutral Bay	North Shore	Historic house	website, home of children's author and illustrator May Gibbs
McCrossin's Mill Museum	Uralla	Northern Tablelands	Art	website, operated by the Uralla Historical Society, art, local history and culture
McFeeters Motor Museum	Forbes	Central West	Automotive	website, veteran, vintage, classic and custom cars
Melvie Chick Historical Museum	Cundletown	Mid North Coast	Local history	website, operated by the Cundletown & Lower Manning Historical Society
Memorial Walk Museum	Bathurst	Central Tablelands	Military	website, military art and artifacts
Meroogal	Nowra	South Coast	Historic house	website, operated by the Historic Houses Trust of New South Wales
Mid North Coast Maritime Museum	Port Macquarie	Mid North Coast	Maritime	website
Miss Porter's House	Newcastle	Hunter Region	Historic house	website, operated by the National Trust of Australia, Edwardian terrace house with 100 years of collectables, 1909–1940 furnishings
Miss Traill's House	Bathurst	Central Tablelands	Historic house	Operated by the National Trust of Australia, features owner's mementos including family items, furniture, horse-racing memorabilia, and artefacts linked to the early history of Bathurst
Molong Museum	Molong	Central West	Local history	website
Monte Cristo Homestead	Junee	Riverina	Historic house	Late 19th century Victorian manor
Moree Plains Gallery	Moree	North West Slopes	Art	website
Moruya Museum	Moruya	South Coast	Historic house	website, 19th century period house, operated by the Moruya and District Historical Society
Mosman Art Gallery	Mosman	North Shore (Sydney)	Art	website
Mount Victoria Museum	Mount Victoria	Blue Mountains	Local history	website
Murray Art Museum Albury	Albury	Riverina	Art	website
Museum of Antiquities at UNE	Armidale	Northern Tablelands	Archaeology	website, part of the University of New England, antiquities from the ancient Mediterranean, Near East, objects and ethnographic material from Australia, South East Asia, New Guinea, the Pacific region, Mesoamerica and Africa
Museum of Education at UNE	Armidale	Northern Tablelands	Education	website, part of the University of New England, features two original 1880s school buildings, open by appointment
Museum of Fire	Penrith	Greater Western Sydney	Firefighting	website, features large collection of hand drawn, horse drawn and motorised vehicles from the late 18th century up to the 1980s
Museum of Printing at NERAM	Armidale	Northern Tablelands	Media	website, historical printing processes and products, part of the New England Regional Art Museum
Museum of the Riverina	Wagga Wagga	Riverina	Local history	Local history, culture across two sites
Museum of Sydney	Sydney	Inner West	Museum	website
Muswellbrook Regional Arts Centre	Muswellbrook	Hunter Region	Art	website
MV Cape Don	Waverton	North Shore	Maritime	Lighthouse tender museum ship
Narooma Lighthouse Museum	Narooma	South Coast	Maritime	website, original light and optical apparatus from the Montague Island Lightstation
National Motor Racing Museum	Bathurst	Central Tablelands	Automotive	Adjacent to the Mount Panorama Circuit, Australia's motor racing history including famous cars, motorcycles and memorabilia
National Museum of Australian Pottery	Holbrook	Riverina	Art	19th- and early 20th-century Australian pottery
National Transport Museum	Inverell	Northern Tablelands	Transportation	website, vintage, veteran, and classic cars, motorcycles, trucks and buses, also dolls and wedding dresses
New England Regional Art Museum – NERAM	Armidale	Northern Tablelands	Art	website, Australian art in many media, includes six gallery spaces and the Museum of Printing
Newcastle Art Gallery	Newcastle East	Hunter Region	Art	
Newcastle Maritime Centre	Newcastle East	Hunter Region	Maritime	website
Newcastle Museum	Newcastle East	Hunter Region	Multiple	Local history, culture, industry, science
Norah Head Light	Norah Head	Central	Maritime	Tours of the active lighthouse
Norman Lindsay Gallery and Museum	Faulconbridge	Blue Mountains	Art	Operated by the National Trust of Australia, late 19th century home with works of artist and writer Norman Lindsay
Nowra Museum	Nowra	South Coast	Local history	website, operated by the Shoalhaven Historical Society
NSW Rail Museum	Thirlmere	Macarthur	Railway	Includes locomotives and passenger and freight rolling stock
Old Courthouse Museum	Batemans Bay	South Coast	Local history	website, operated by the Clyde River and Batemans Bay Historical Society
Old Dubbo Gaol	Dubbo	Orana	Prison	19th century prison
Old Government House	Parramatta	Greater Western Sydney	Historic house	Operated by the National Trust of Australia, former "country" residence of 10 early governors of New South Wales
Old School Museum	Merimbula	South Coast	Local history	Operated by the Merimbula-Imlay Historical Society
Orange Regional Gallery	Orange	Central West	Art	website
Oxley Museum	Wellington	Orana	Local history	information
Parkes Observatory	Parkes	Central West	Science	Astronomy and space science, history of the radio telescope observatory
Penrith Museum of Printing	Penrith	Greater Western Sydney	Print technology	website
Penrith Regional Gallery & Lewers Bequest	Emu Plains	Greater Western Sydney	Art	website
Pioneer Cottage Museum	Urbenville	Northern Tablelands	Local history	information, period displays of a settler's home
Pioneer Women's Hut	Tumbarumba	Riverina	Women's	website, ingenuity of women in finding solutions to the challenges of looking after a family in early rural Australia
Port Macquarie Courthouse Museum	Port Macquarie	Mid North Coast	History	website, mid 19th century courthouse
Port Macquarie Historical Museum	Port Macquarie	Mid North Coast	Local history	website, operated by the Port Macquarie Historical Society Inc
Powerhouse Motorcycle Museum	Tamworth	New England	Transportation	website, motorcycles from the 1950s to 1980s
Queanbeyan Historical Museum	Queanbeyan	Southern Tablelands	Local history	website, also information
Queanbeyan Printing Museum	Queanbeyan	Southern Tablelands	Media	website, working printing presses and memorabilia
RAAF Wagga Heritage Centre	Forest Hill	Riverina	Aerospace	Indoor and outdoor displays of aircraft, memorabilia and photographs relating to RAAF Base Wagga
Rail Motor Society	Paterson	Hunter Region	Railway	Preserved self-propelled railway vehicles and equipment
Richmond Vale Railway Museum	Wollombi	Hunter Region	Railway	Heritage railway and museum about the former coal mine
Riversdale	Goulburn	Southern Tablelands	Historic house	Operated by the National Trust of Australia, 19th century homestead
Robertson Heritage Railway Station	Robertson			website
Rockley Mill	Rockley	Central Tablelands	Local history	information, also historic mill machinery
Rose Seidler House	Wahroonga	North Shore	Historic house	Operated by Sydney Living Museums, mid 20th century modern house
Roto House	Port Macquarie	Mid North Coast	Historic house	website, located in Macquarie Nature Reserve
Rouse Hill Estate	Rouse Hill	North Western Sydney	Historic House	website
Royal Flying Doctor Service Visitors' Centre	Broken Hill	Western Plains	Geology	information, history and work of the Royal Flying Doctor Service of Australia
Royal Prince Alfred Hospital Museum	Sydney	Inner West	Medical	Website, History of the Royal Prince Alfred Hospital
Sacred Spaces	Singleton	Hunter Region	Religious	website, convent and museum of the Sisters of Mercy
Saumarez Homestead	Armidale	Northern Tablelands	Historic house	Operated by the National Trust of Australia, Edwardian mansion with original furnishings
Schaeffer House (Grafton, New South Wales)	Grafton	Northern Rivers	Historic house	website, Victorian period house, operated by the Clarence River Historical Society
Shear Outback	Hay	Riverina	Industry	website, shearing history and future technologies
Shoalhaven City Arts Centre	Nowra	South Coast	Art	website
Silverton Gaol Museum	Silverton	Western Plains	Prison	website, also local history exhibits, operated by the Broken Hill Historical Society
Silverton School Museum	Silverton	Western Plains	Education	website, late 19th century school used until 1970
Singleton Museum	Singleton	Hunter Region	Local history	website, operated by the Singleton Historical Society
St Clair Local History Museum & Archives	Goulburn	Southern Tablelands	Local history	information
Stoke Stable Museum	Carcoar	Central West	Local history	information
Sturt Australia	Mittagong	Southern Highlands	Art	website, education center for Australian craft and design with exhibit gallery
Sulphide Street Railway & Historical Museum	Broken Hill	Western Plains	Railway	information, steam trains, railway machinery and a mineral collection
Sunnyside Historic Home & South Sea Island Museum	Cooranbong	Hunter Region	Historic house	information
Susannah Place	Sydney	Inner West	Historic House	website
S.H.P Memorial School of Arts	Tenterfield	New England	Biographical	Operated by the National Trust of Australia, features memorabilia owned by Sir Henry Parkes
Snowy Scheme Museum	Adaminaby	Monaro	Technology	Exhibits relating to the Snowy Mountains Hydro Electric Scheme
Sydney Bus Museum	Leichhardt			website
Sydney Tramway Museum	Loftus			website
Tomago House	Tomago	Hunter Region	Historic house	website, operated by the National Trust of Australia
Tamworth Powerstation Museum	Tamworth	New England	Technology	website, history of electricity and the impact of the development of electricity on modern society
Tamworth Regional Gallery	Tamworth	New England	Art	website, features textile and silver collections
Tarella Cottage Museum	Wentworth Falls	Blue Mountains	Local history	website, operated by the Blue Mountains Historical Society
Temora Aviation Museum	Temora	Riverina	Aerospace	Historic military and civilian aircraft that range from World War II to the Vietnam War era
Temora Rural Museum	Temora	Riverina	Local History	Historic village museum showing the life of the area
Tenterfield Railway Station Museum	Tenterfield	Northern Tablelands	Railway	website, Victorian railway station, exhibits of heritage rolling stock, model railway
The Mint	Sydney		Hospital	website
The Rail Journeys Museum	Werris Creek			website
Timbertown	Wauchope	Mid North Coast	Open air	19th century sawmiller's village with working full-size narrow gauge steam train
Tinonee Historical Museum	Tinonee	Mid North Coast	Local history	website, operated by the Tinonee Historical Society
Tomago House	Tomago	Hunter Region	Historic house	website, operated by the National Trust of Australia, 19th century homestead
Trial Bay Gaol	Laggers Point	Mid North Coast	Prison	Remains of a late 19th century prison and internment camp in World War I, located in Arakoon National Park
Turkish Bath Museum	Mount Wilson	Blue Mountains	Local history	website, operated by the Mt Wilson/Mt Irvine Historical Society
Turon Technology Museum	Sofala	Central West	Technology	website, development of steam and internal engines, the transition to the internal combustion engine
Tweed River Art Gallery	Murwillumbah	Northern Rivers	Art	Regional art gallery
Tweed River Regional Museum	Murwillumbah	Northern Rivers	Local history	website, also branches in Tweed Heads and Uki
University of New South Wales Galleries	Paddington	Eastern Suburbs	Art	website, part of the College of Arts and Sciences of the University of New South Wales
Valley Heights Rail Museum	Valley Heights	Blue Mountains	Railway	Heritage railway, depot, equipment and museum
Vaucluse House	Vaucluse	Eastern Suburbs	Historic house	Operated by Sydney Living Museums, 19th century estate
Vienna Cottage	Hunters Hill	Northern Suburbs	Historic house	website, operated by the National Trust of Australia, late 19th century home
Wagga Wagga Art Gallery	Wagga Wagga	Riverina	Art	website, exhibits of Riverina artists and visiting exhibitions from Australia and overseas, includes the National Art Glass Gallery and Margaret Carnegie Print Collection
Wagga Wagga Rail Heritage Museum	Wagga Wagga	Riverina	Railway	information, located in the Wagga Wagga railway station
Walcha Pioneer Cottage Museum	Walcha	Northern Tablelands	Local history	website
Warren Museum & Art Gallery	Warren NSW	Orana	Local & Indigenous history	https://thewam.com.au Modern-style museum, featuring local history. Open Wednesday to Sunday. Art gallery featuring mostly local artists. Free entry to art gallery.
West Darling Machinery Preservation Society	Broken Hill	Western Plains	Technology	website, heritage farm and mining machinery
Western Plains Cultural Centre	Dubbo	Orana	Art	website
White's Mineral Art Gallery & Living Mining Museum	Broken Hill	Western Plains	Art	website, paintings made with local minerals, exhibits of the architectural and mining history of the city, mining artifacts
Wing Hing Long Museum	Tingha	Northern Tablelands	Local history	website, history of Tingha's Chinese heritage and great tin boom, period general store display
Wivenhoe	Narellan	Macarthur	Historic house	1830s home of Sir Charles Cowper, a Premier of New South Wales
Wollongong City Gallery	Wollongong	Illawarra	Art	website
Wollongong Science Centre and Planetarium	Port Kembla	Illawarra	Science	website, part of the University of Wollongong
Wollombi Endeavour Museum	Wollombi	Hunter Region	Local history	information, information
Woodford Academy	Woodford	Blue Mountains	Historic house	website, operated by the National Trust of Australia, 1830s building
Yamba Museum	Yamba	Northern Rivers, NSW	Local History, Maritime heritage	website operated by the Port of Yamba Historical Society
Yanco Powerhouse Museum	Yanco	Riverina	Agriculture	Displays of farm equipment, local history
Yass and District Museum	Yass	Southern Tablelands	Local history	information
Yeoval Historical Museum	Yeoval	Central West	Local history	information
Zoology Museum at the University of New England	Armidale	Northern Tablelands	Natural history	website, teaching museum open to the public
Tumbarumba visitor information centre/Museum	Tumbarumba	Southern Tablelands	Local History	website
The Arms of Australia Inn Museum	Emu Plains	Greater Western Sydney	Local History	website
Nepean Naval Museum	Penrith	Greater Western Sydney	Naval History	website
Mad Max 2 Museum	Silverton	Far West NSW	Mad Max 2	website
Donald Bradman Museum & International Cricket Hall of Fame	Bowral	Southern Highlands	Cricket	website
Bega Cheese Heritage Centre	Bega	South-East NSW	Cheese	website

== Defunct museums ==
- Legends Surf Museum, Coffs Harbour
- Old Sydney Town

== See also ==
- List of museums in Australia
