= HMPNGS Lakekamu =

Papua New Guinea Defence Force vessel

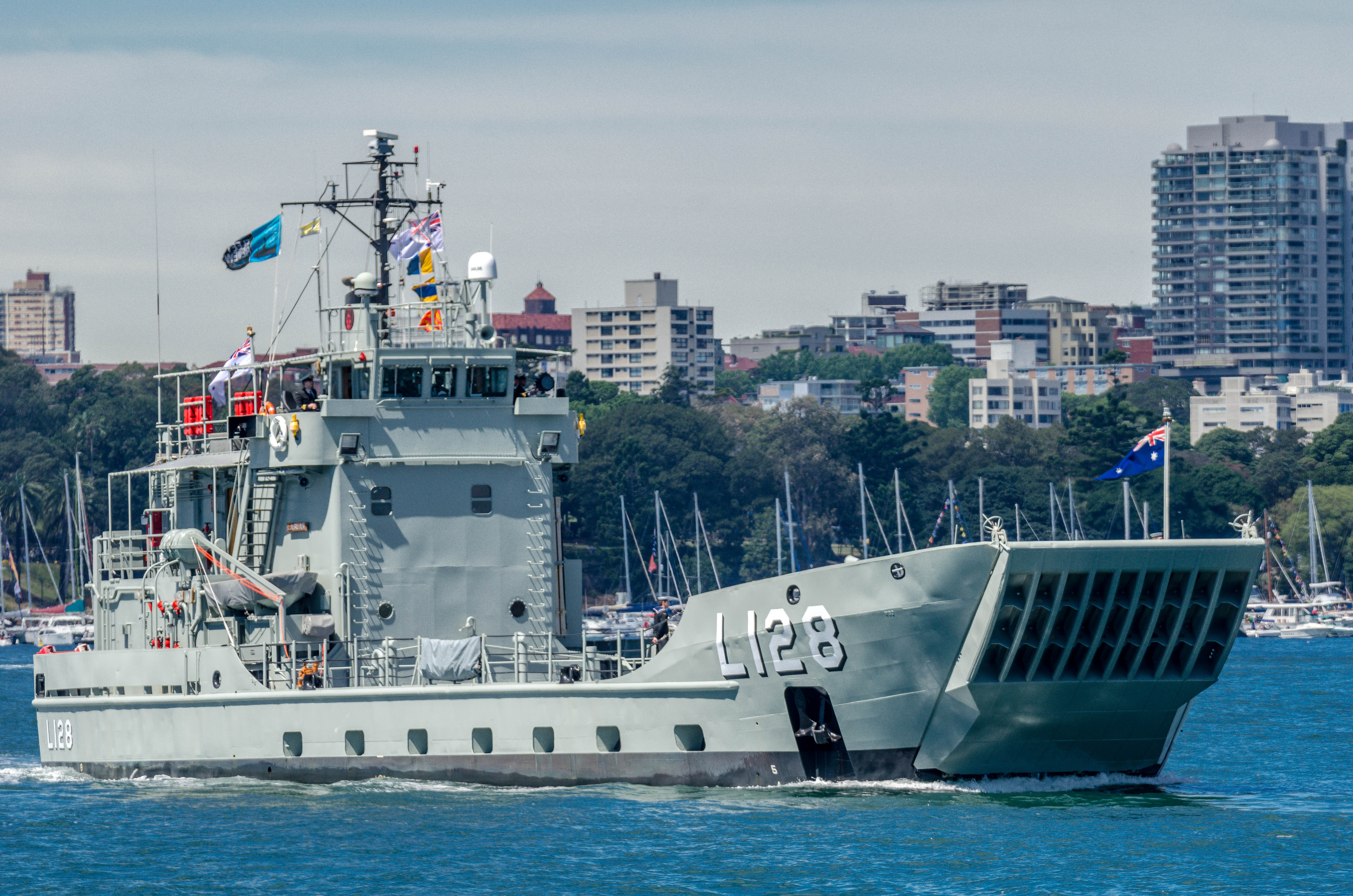
- HMAS Labuan during the International Fleet Review 2013

History

Australia
- Name: HMAS Labuan
- Namesake: Amphibious landings at Labuan
- Builder: Walkers Limited
- Laid down: 1 November 1971
- Launched: 29 December 1971
- Commissioned: 9 March 1973
- Decommissioned: 20 November 2014
- Home port: HMAS Moreton, Brisbane (1973–1993); HMAS Cairns, Cairns (1993–2014)
- Motto: "Fail Not"
- Honours and awards: Battle honours: East Timor 1999–2000
- Fate: Transferred to Papua New Guinea

Papua New Guinea
- Name: HMPNGS Lakekamu
- Namesake: Lakekamu River
- Commissioned: 4 December 2014
- Status: Active as of 2014

General characteristics
- Class & type: Balikpapan-class landing craft heavy
- Displacement: 316 tons
- Length: 44.5 m (146 ft)
- Beam: 10.1 m (33 ft)
- Propulsion: Two GE diesels
- Speed: 9 knots (17 km/h; 10 mph)
- Capacity: 180 tons of vehicle cargo or 400 soldiers
- Complement: 13
- Armament: 2 × 0.50 inch machine guns

HMPNGS Lakekamu is Balikpapan-class landing craft heavy (LCH) operated by the Maritime Operations Element of the Papua New Guinea Defence Force (PNGDF). The vessel was one of eight built for the Royal Australian Navy (RAN) in the 1970s, and was commissioned into the RAN as HMAS Labuan (L 128) in March 1973. Labuan was decommissioned in November 2014. She was transferred to the PNGDF for use as a training ship and was commissioned as HMPNGS Lakekamu in December 2014.

== Design and construction ==
The eight-vessel Balikpapan class was ordered as a locally manufactured replacement for the Australian Army's LSM-1-class landing ship medium and ALC 50 landing craft. They are 44.5 metres (146 ft) long, with a beam of 10.1 metres (33 ft), and a draught of 1.9 metres (6 ft 3 in). The landing craft have a standard displacement of 316 tons, with a full load displacement of 503 tons. They are propelled by two G.M. Detroit 6–71 diesel motors, providing 675 brake horsepower to the two propeller shafts, allowing the vessels to reach 9 knots (17 km/h; 10 mph). The standard ship's company is 13-strong. The Balikpapans are equipped with a Decca RM 916 navigational radar, and fitted with two 7.62 millimetres (0.300 in) machine guns for self-defence.

The LCHs have a maximum payload of 180 tons; equivalent to 3 Leopard 1 tanks, 13 M113 armoured personnel carriers 23 quarter-tonne trucks, or four LARC-V amphibious cargo vehicles. As a troop transport, a Balikpapan-class vessel can transport up to 400 soldiers between a larger amphibious ship and the shore, or embark 60 soldiers in six-berth caravans for longer voyages. The vessel's payload affects the range: at 175 tons of cargo, each vessel has a range of 1,300 nautical miles (2,400 km; 1,500 mi), which increases to 2,280 nautical miles (4,220 km; 2,620 mi) with a 150-ton payload, and 3,000 nautical miles (5,600 km; 3,500 mi) when unladen. The flat, box-like keel causes the ships to roll considerably in other-than-calm conditions, limiting their ability to make long voyages.

The vessel was laid down by Walkers Limited, at Maryborough, Queensland on 1 November 1971, and launched on 29 December 1971. She was commissioned into the RAN as HMAS Labuan (pennant number L 128) on 9 March 1973. Labuan is named after the World War II amphibious landings at the Borneo island of Labuan. On entering service, she was homeported at HMAS Moreton in Brisbane.

== Operational history ==
After completing working-up exercises, in May 1973, Labuan transported Clearance Diving Team One (CDT1) to Moreton Island to destroy a World War II era torpedo. In August, CDT1 was embarked again aboard Labuan, this time for a two-month deployment to Papua New Guinea. Between 15 August and 12 October, the landing craft visited communities around Papua New Guinea, with the clearance divers clearing reef passages and disposing of unexploded ordnance from World War II. After CDT1 flew back to Australia on 12 October, Labuan surveyed the Fly River, reaching 135 miles (217 km). On 19 October, the vessel left Papua New Guinea and sailed to Cairns with sister ship HMAS Brunei. In November, Labuan was used for the Army exercise Temple Tower. On 21 November, Labuan and two fishing boats towed the rafts of the Las Balsas Expedition into the mouth of the Richmond River, after the rafts drifted off course on the final leg of their trans-Pacific voyage.

Between March and May 1974, the landing craft was based in Singapore, and was used to transport military materiel and stores to and from Belawan, Indonesia. Several major exercises were participated in during the rest of 1974: Kangaroo One in June, and Kentia Palm in September. During October and November, Labuan was stationed on the Great Barrier Reef with clearance divers embarked, as part of a project tracking the spread of the Crown of Thorns starfish. Labuan was the only RAN Balikpapan-class ship not involved in Operation Navy Help Darwin (the RAN response following Cyclone Tracy's destruction of Darwin in December 1974), as she was undergoing refit at the time. In late February 1975, Labuan collided with a lighter during Exercise Wagon Train II. The damage was limited to patching a hole above the waterline. During April and May, the landing craft operated in southern Australian waters in support of Army training exercises. Labuan returned to Sydney, and during 12 and 13 May transported the RAN's first two Sea King helicopters to Jervis Bay. The rest of 1975 and most of 1976 was spent on training exercises.

During September and October 1977, Labuan visited ports throughout South East Asia, cumulating in Biak on 6 October, where materiel used for Operation Cenderawasih – mapping and charting of Irian Jaya – was loaded aboard. The ship returned to Townsville on 25 October. During June and July 1978, Labuan was deployed on Operation Beachcomber – surveying of northern Queensland beaches. The rest of 1978 was spent on exercises. On 12 February 1979, Labuan began a refit. After the refit's conclusion, the vessel was transferred to the Royal Australian Navy Reserve (RANR) on 15 June 1979 to serve as the training vessel for the Port Brisbane Division. In RNVR service, Labuan was used to provide training and seagoing experience to Reserve personnel, generally on two-week deployments. Despite being operated by the RANR, Labuan maintained a heavy schedule of exercise deployments and operations in support of the Army and RAN. During September and October 1980, clearance divers were embarked aboard Labuan for three weeks of shipping channel clearing around the Solomon Islands.

On 9 April 1987, Labuan rescued the 11 crew of the yacht Madame de Farge, which had run aground during the Sydney to Mooloolaba Yacht Race. During January 1988, the vessel was in Ballina, New South Wales for Bicentenary celebrations. In September, Labuan was in Sydney for the Bicentennial Naval Salute. Labuan was granted the right of Freedom of Entry to Ballina in 1988. At the start of 1992, the final RANR training cruise occurred, after which the vessel was docked in Cairns for a refit. On 17 August, Labuan was reassigned to the Permanent Naval Force, but because she was still undergoing refit, no permanent command team was assigned, and the post-refit trials were conducted under frequently-changing commanding officers.

From March until May 1993, Labuan was at Forgacs' Newcastle shipyard for removal of asbestos. In August, the ship's home base was relocated to HMAS Cairns in Cairns, Queensland. On 31 December, the ship was forced to sail to avoid Tropical Cyclone Rewa. During 1995, Labuan provided logistical support to NORFORCE. On 14 May 1996, while returning from Exercise Thunder Bay 96, the landing craft ran aground on a reef off South Harrison Island. She was refloated on the next high tide, and returned to Cairns for repairs. In March 1997, the ship was placed on standby to evacuate Australian citizens from political unrest in Papua New Guinea; this need did not eventuate, and Labuan resumed normal operations in early April. During November, Labuan and Tarakan delivered humanitarian supplies to drought-stricken areas in northern Papua New Guinea. From December 1997 to February 1998, the vessel was berthed in Cairns for communications upgrades.

During 1998 and 1999, Labuan made four deployments to Bougainville Island as part of Operation Bel Isi: March to April and August to October in 1998, and January to March and July to August in 1999. In between these deployments, the ship continued on a program of training exercises and logistical support for other defence units. Labuan sailed to Dili, East Timor on 18 September 1999 as part of INTERFET. The ship provided logistic support, beach landing capability, and rest facilities for INTERFET forces. She remained in the area until 14 October, and was redeployed in support of INTERFET during November–December 1999, February–April 2000, June–July 2000, August–September 2000 and November–December 2000. These deployments were later recognised with the battle honour "East Timor 1999–2000". On returning to Cairns at the end of 2000, the ship was prepared for a Life of Type Extension refit; the refit itself lasted from late February 2001 to early September 2001. On 15 October, Labuan sailed on another deployment to Bougainville, under Operation Bel Isi II.

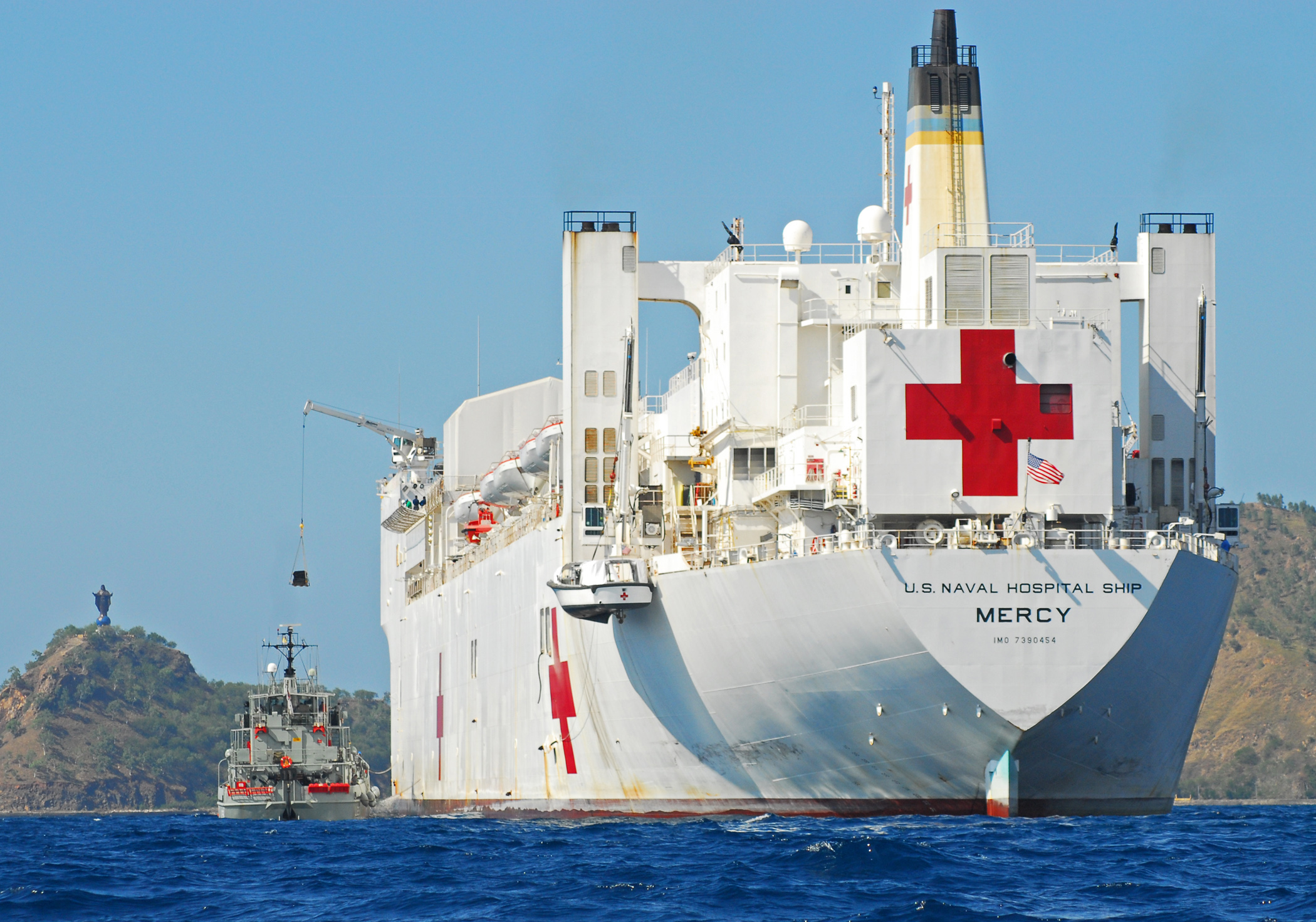
Labuan taking on cargo from the hospital ship USNS Mercy during Pacific Partnership 2010

During January 2002, Labuan was sent to Dili with a cargo of military vehicles. From April to July, she was deployed to Bougainville as part of Operation Bel Isi II. Subsequent deployments as part of the operation were made during September to October 2002, and April to May 2003. From July until September, the ship was in the Solomon Islands as part of the RAN contribution to the Regional Assistance Mission to Solomon Islands (RAMSI), with Labuan undertaking logistic support operations, patrols, and assisting in the collection of weapons under the gun amnesty. A second RAMSI deployment occurred from April until May 2004. In November 2004, the ship visited Ballina. In March 2006, Labuan was involved in humanitarian operations following Cyclone Larry (after having ridden out the storm herself in Wahday Creek), moving supplies and equipment from Townsville to Mourilyan. In June 2006, the ship transported materiel between Darwin and Dili in support of Operation Astute. During August, Labuan was deployed on border patrol operations under Operation Resolute. Further Resolute deployments occurred during September and October, and in June 2007.

During August and September 2008, Labuan hosted scientists from the Defence Science and Technology Organisation, Curtin University, and the Universities of Queensland and Sydney during a research survey of Beaked Whales. From April until June 2009, Labuan and Tarakan were deployed to the southwest Pacific, visiting Vanuatu, Tonga, and Western Samoa. In July 2010, the ship was involved in the US Navy's Pacific Partnership humanitarian assistance operation, providing over-the-shore support and acting as a forward base for medical and dental personnel during visits to Indonesia and Timor Leste. In October 2013, Labuan participated in the International Fleet Review 2013 in Sydney.

Labuan visited Ballina in August 2014, during the ship's final cruise before decommissioning. After participating in Exercise Croix Du Sud off New Caledonia, Labuan and Tarakan delivered humanitarian supplies to remote coastal settlements in the Solomon Islands in September 2014 as part of Australian support efforts in the region.

Labuan, along with Brunei and Tarakan, were decommissioned on 20 November 2014. The ship's bell and ceremonial life ring are to be put on display at the Ballina Naval & Maritime Museum.

In 2013, the Australian government had promised to gift one of the Balikpapan-class vessels due to leave RAN service to Papua New Guinea. To this end, Labuan was sailed to Port Moresby by a combined RAN and PNGDF complement, and was commissioned into the PNGDF Maritime Operations Element on 4 December 2014. The ship's new name comes from the Lakekamu River, in Papua New Guinea's Gulf Province.

HMPGS Lakekamu is used as a training ship. As part of Australia's assistance to the Papua New Guinea Defence Force, the Royal Australian Navy provides her commanding officer and a chief of the boat.

== Sources ==
Books

- Gillett, Ross (1988). Australian and New Zealand Warships since 1946. Brookvale, NSW: Child & Associates. ISBN 0-86777-219-0. OCLC 23470364.
- Wertheim, Eric, ed. (2007). The Naval Institute Guide to Combat Fleets of the World: Their Ships, Aircraft, and Systems (15th ed.). Annapolis, MD: Naval Institute Press. p. 26. ISBN 978-1-59114-955-2. OCLC 140283156.

Journal articles

- Swinden, Greg (April 2013). "Heavy Lifting for Four Decades: The Navy's Landing Craft Heavy". The Navy. 75 (2). Navy League of Australia: 20–24. ISSN 1322-6231.
