= Ballina Naval & Maritime Museum =

- "Take a voyage of discovery"
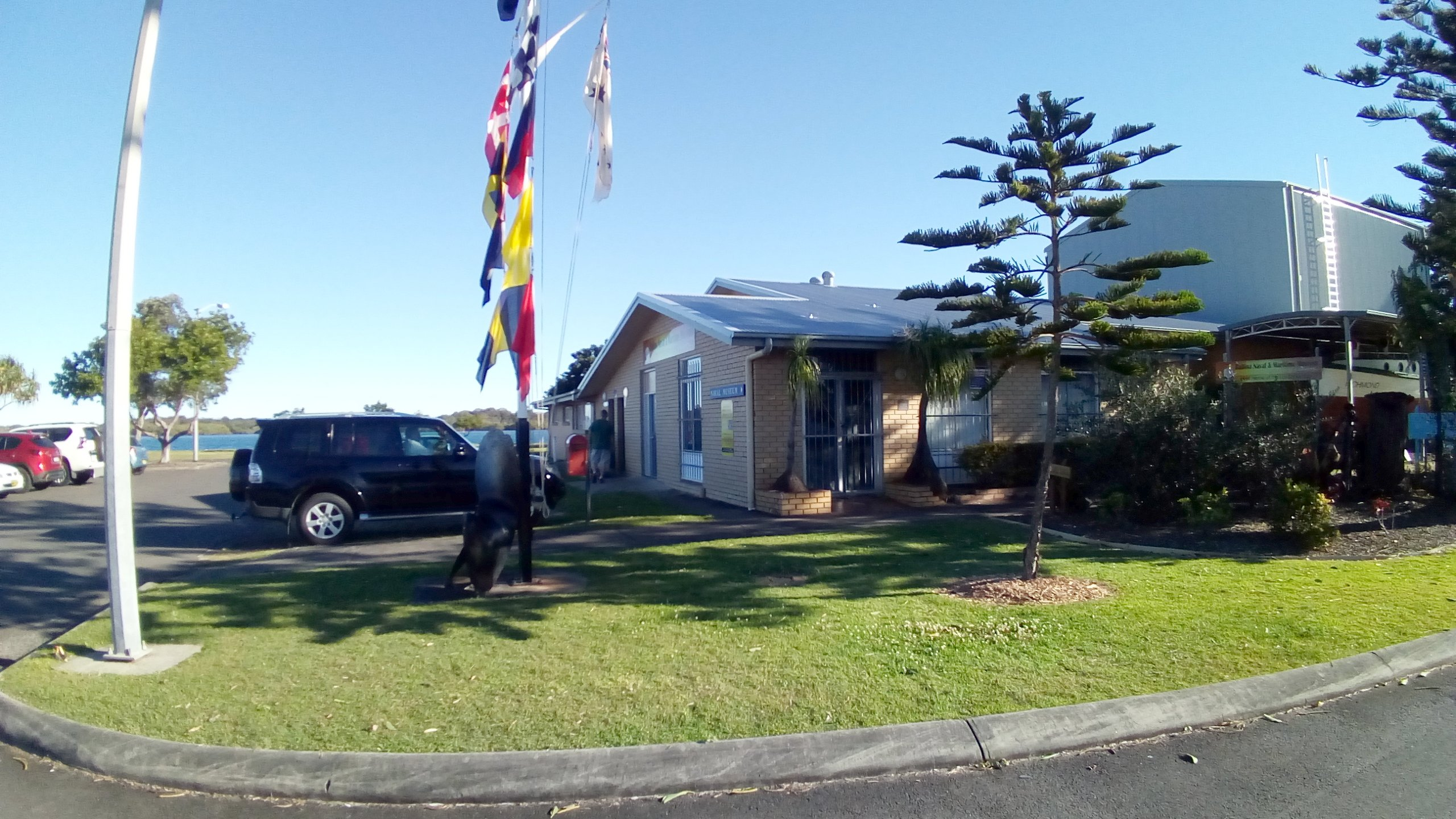
- Ballina Naval and Maritime Museum
- Established: 1983
- Location: Regatta Avenue, Ballina, New South Wales, Australia
- Coordinates: 28.873314°S 153.564480°E
- Type: Local maritime history museum
- Key holdings: Las Balsas raft
- Founder: Roy Kilner
- Owners: Operated by Ballina Naval & Maritime Museum
- Parking: Yes
- Website: http://www.ballinamaritimemuseum.org

Museum entrance

The Ballina Naval & Maritime Museum is a local maritime history museum located in the town of Ballina, New South Wales in Australia. The museum explicitly houses and records the local maritime history of Ballina and the former mariners that reside in the town. Many of the museum's founding members, as well as some current volunteers served in the Royal Australian Navy. The museum features displays and models honouring events and history from the RAN and navies from other nations.

The museum is located on Regatta avenue, behind the Ballina Tourist information centre. The museum is noted for maintaining in its collection one of the three Las Balsas craft and it also manages the largest naval and merchant ship model collection in Australia.

== Collection ==
Interior of the museum including a scale model of the Cutty Sark

Interior of the museum (2) including the largest exhibit (Las Balsas raft)

One of the many display cases featuring detailed model ships

The museum has extensive displays featuring:

- The Las Balsas raft
- Port of Ballina and Local History
- Tribute to women in the Navy
- Interactive displays, including the SS Wollongbar
- DVD showings
- A working triple expansion steam engine
- Mark 9 21" Torpedo
- Model Ships

=== Las Balsas ===
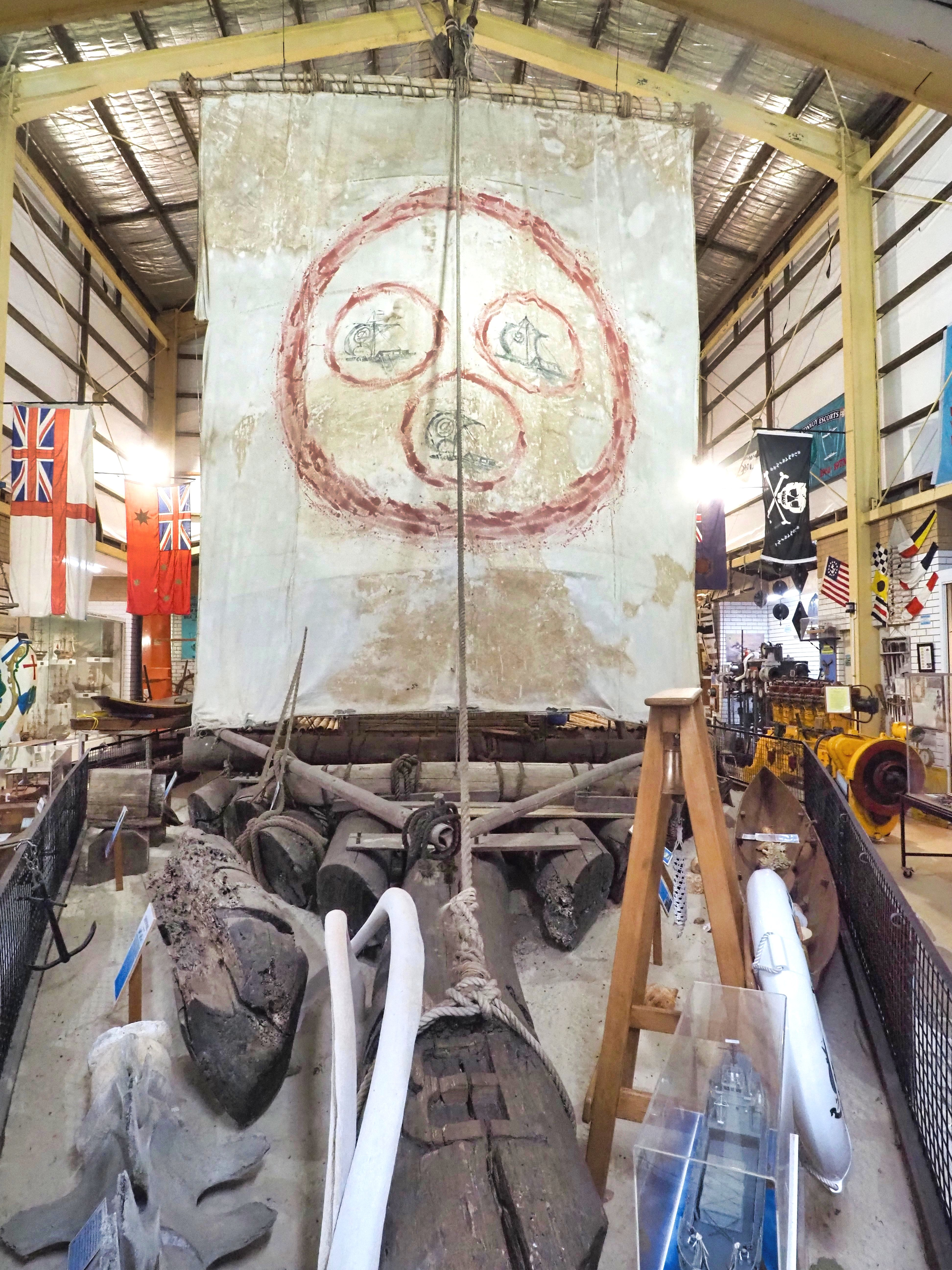
The Las Balsas raft exhibit

In 1973, the Las Balsas rafts were towed into Ballina by fishing trawlers after their journey from Ecuador. One of the rafts is preserved in the Ballina Naval and Maritime Museum. They had planned to arrive in Mooloolaba in Queensland, but currents forced them off their course. Their journey was almost twice as long as the Kon-Tiki expeditions of 1947 and proved that people could have travelled across the Pacific in ancient times.

=== ANZAC Gallipoli Garden ===
Outside the Museum: the ANZAC Gallipoli Garden, August 2026

A small garden with relevant exhibits outside the Museum commemorates fallen soldiers and sailors of the ANZAC Gallipoli campaign.

== Gallery ==
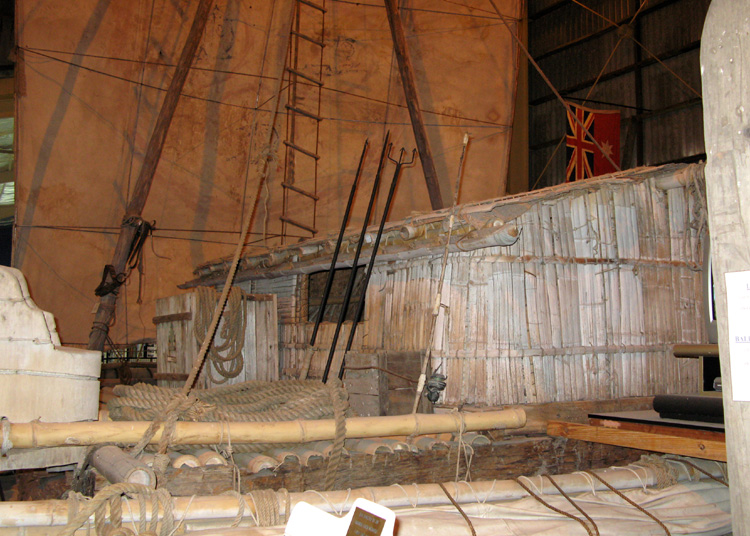
The Las Balsas raft at the Ballina Naval and Maritime Museum

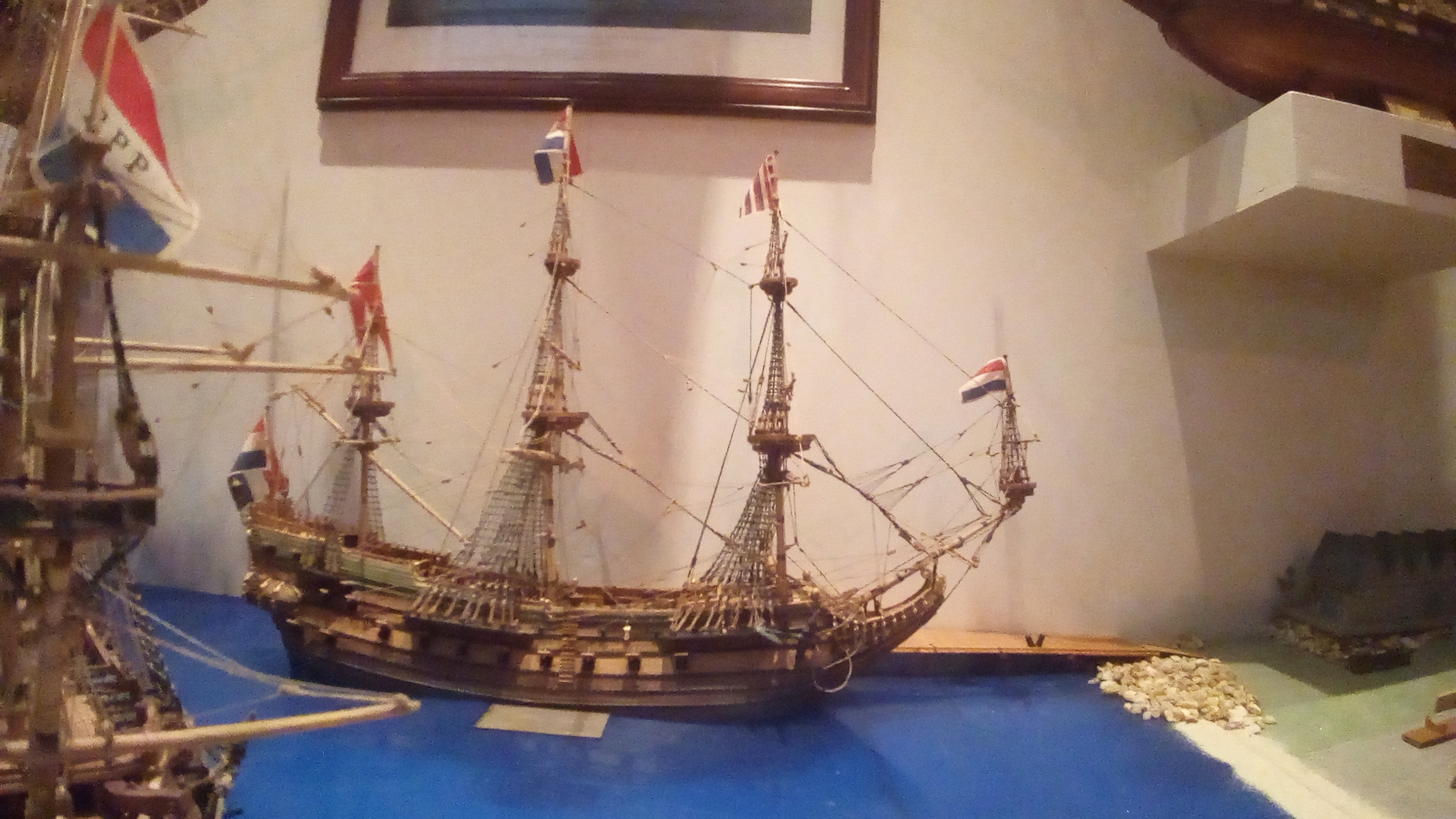
A model of a Dutch Indiaman

== See also ==
- List of museums in New South Wales
- List of maritime museums
