= Vital Alsar Pacific raft expeditions =

20th-century oceanic expeditions by Vital Alsar

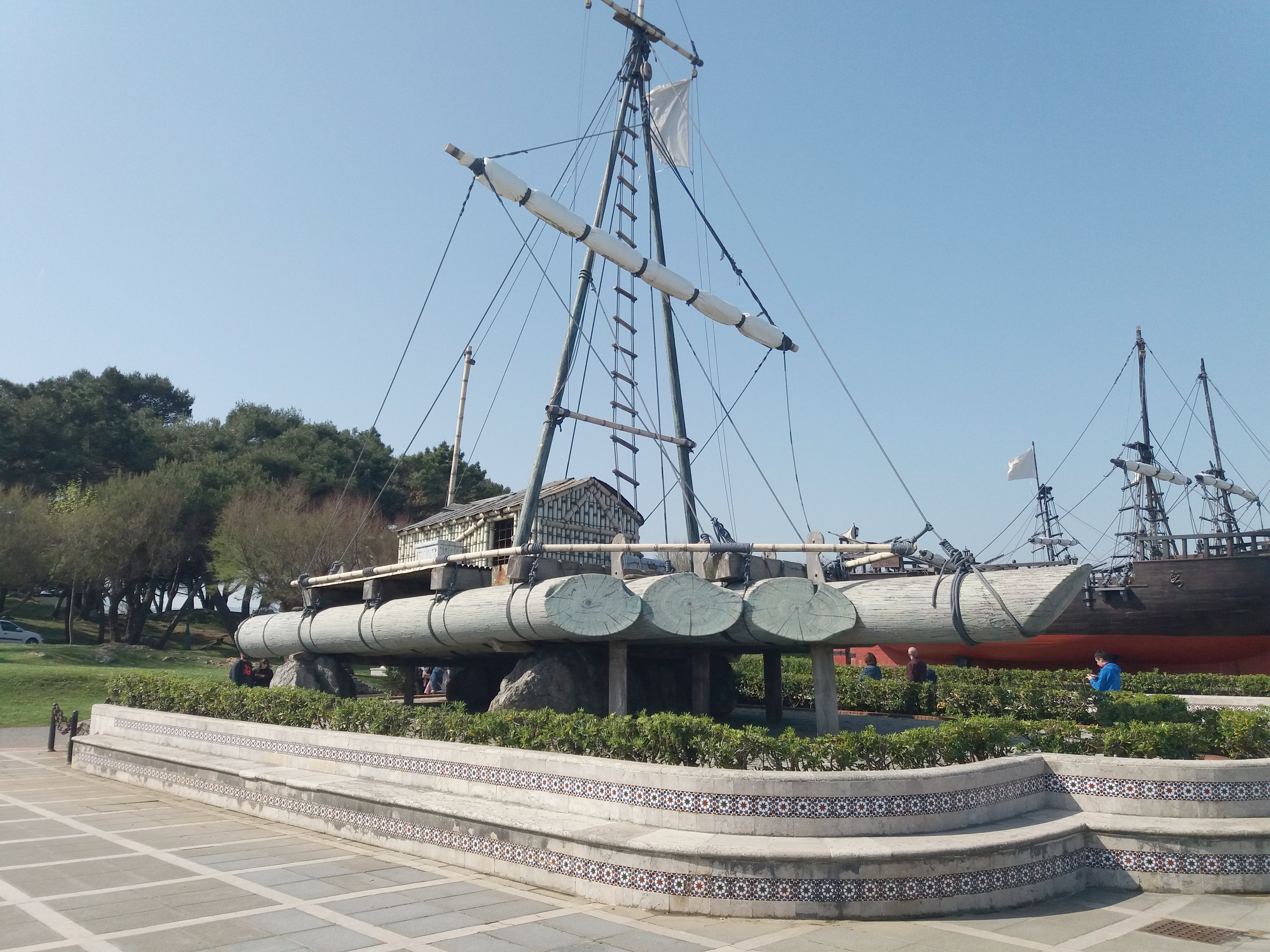
Replica of Alsar's original La Balsa raft on display at the Museo del Hombre y el Mar (Museum of Man and the Sea), Magdalena Peninsula, Santander, Spain

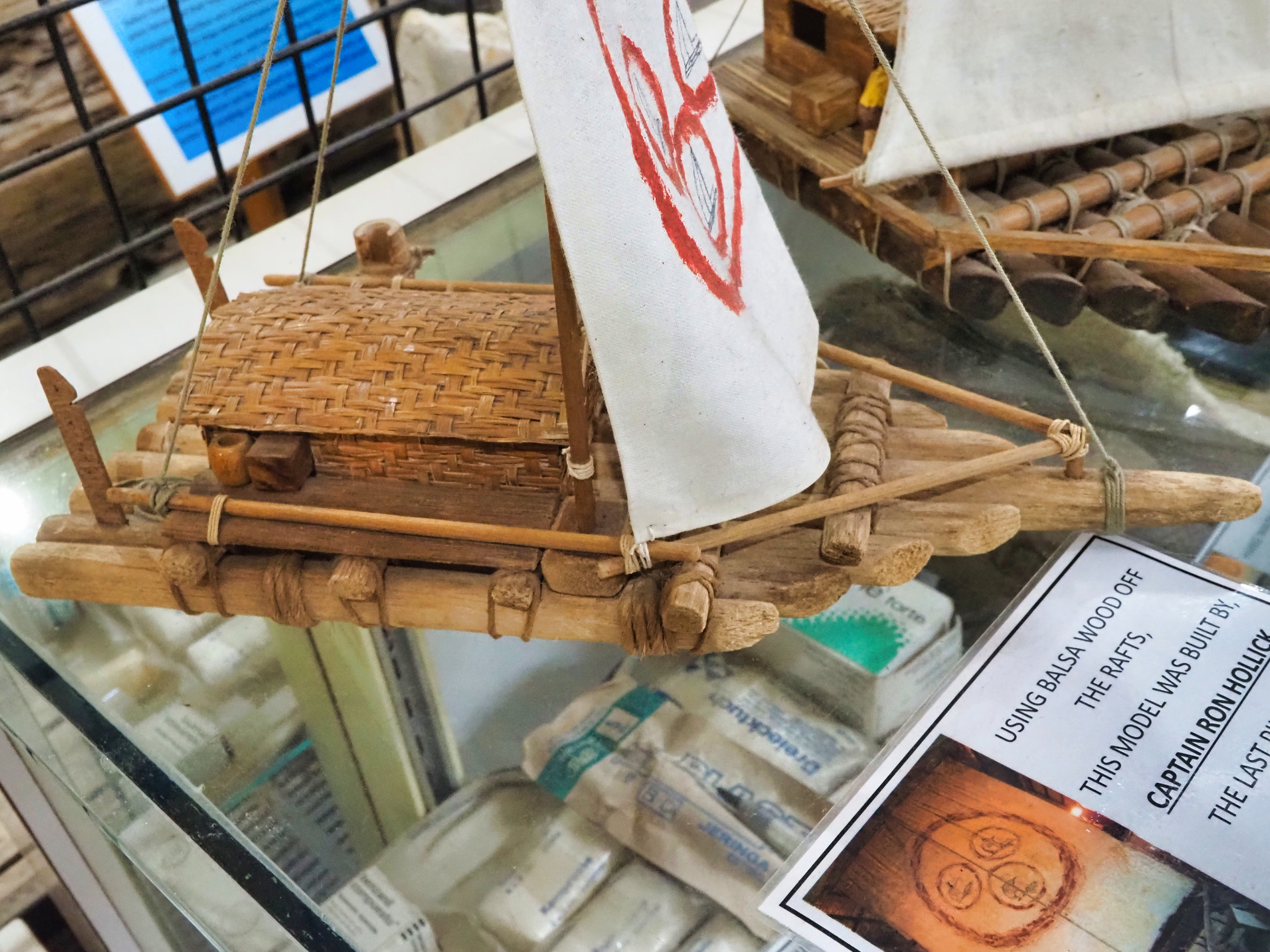
Las Balsas raft exhibit, Ballina Maritime Museum - model of a "Las Balsas" raft

Between 1966 and 1973, Spanish explorer Vital Alsar led three expeditions to cross the Pacific Ocean by raft – La Pacífica in 1966, La Balsa in 1970 and Las Balsas in 1973. Travelling from Ecuador, South America, to Australia, the first expedition failed, but the second and third succeeded, both setting the record for the longest known raft voyages in history – 13,800 kilometres (8,600 mi) and 14,000 kilometres (8,700 mi) respectively.

== Aim ==
The aim of the expeditions was to prove that the Pacific Islands could have been populated by migrations from South America in the centuries before the Spanish Conquistadors arrived. Alsar maintained that ancient mariners knew the Pacific currents and winds as well as modern humans know road maps.

It was hoped to double the distance achieved by the Kon-Tiki expedition, the 1947 raft crossing by Thor Heyerdahl from South America to the Polynesian islands. Like the Kon-Tiki expedition, the aim was to see if a raft made from the materials available in the 16th century in pre-Columbian South America, when such vessels had been observed by Spanish sailors, could navigate the journey.

Having been surprised by the seaworthiness of La Balsa, being confident they could have gone on to reach Africa had they wished, the crew initially made plans for a third voyage, a circular navigation of the Pacific, from South America to the Polynesian islands and back. Ultimately however, the next voyage was planned to repeat the original crossing, but this time with three rafts – in an attempt to show that early civilizations could have purposefully navigated in large numbers and with cargo, on fleets of rafts of 10 or even 100 strong. The Las Balsas voyage was also designed to counter those people who believed the success of the La Balsa voyage was a fluke.

== Finance ==
To help promote the Las Balsas expedition, Alsar got the prospective crew to build scale models of the rafts, which were then presented to prospective backers. Surrealist Salvador Dalí donated an original artwork for the sails, the sale of which later helped crew members recoup debts and pay for their return journeys.

== La Pacífica ==
His first adventure took place in 1966. The day after his wedding, he boarded a simple raft, La Pacífica, intended to cover the route between Ecuador and Australia. This journey was cut short by a severe teredo worm attack in the wood of his raft. The raft sank after 143 days of navigation, with the crew being rescued by a German ship.

== La Balsa ==
The second raft, La Balsa (Spanish for The Raft), featured a balsa wood and hemp rope built structure, to which was attached two hardwood masts, to support a square canvas sail. In contrast to the oar used for steering on Kon-Tiki, the La Balsa featured a hardwood moving keelboard (known as Guaras in Ecuador) which allowed it to be actively sailed toward favourable currents, rather than drifting.

The voyage was to be from Guayaquil in Ecuador. Alsar had recruited Marc Modena, a Frenchman, and Norman Tetreault, a Canadian, and with work already begun, they were later joined by Chilean student Gabriel Salas. The crew was also joined by a stowaway cat named Minet, whom they called the "fifth crew member."

The La Balsa expedition lasted 160 days, starting in Ecuador on May 29, 1970, and ended at Mooloolaba in Australia on November 5, 1970.

The 8,600 mile (13,800 km), voyage was, at the time, the longest in known history.

Following the expedition, the raft was taken on a road tour of Australia, being displayed in Brisbane, Sydney, Melbourne and Adelaide, before being shipped to Spain.

== Las Balsas ==
The 1973 Las Balsas expedition used three rafts, and became the longest-known raft voyage in history. It is the only known multi-raft crossing of the Pacific to date.

=== Crew ===
The expedition consisted of three rafts, twelve sailors and three cats. Each raft had four crewmen and one cat.

Alsar required the prospective crew members to be able to navigate and be able to speak three languages.

Except for the captains, the nine remaining members of the expedition changed rafts periodically.

Having returned to Chile a month after the first voyage, original in La Balsa (1970), crew member Gabriel Salas was invited to join the Las Balsas crew.

The crew was made of several nationalities:

- Vital Alsar, captain of the Guayaquil and expedition leader Spain.
- Marc Modena, captain of the Mooloolaba France.
- Jorge Ramírez, captain of the Aztlán Mexico.
- Fernand Robichaud Canada.
- Greg Holden Canada.
- Gaston Colin Canada.
- Tom McCormick United States.
- Tom Ward United States.
- Mike Fitzgibbons United States
- Hugo Becerra Chile (Becerra remained in Australia; the others eventually returned to their homeland).
- Gabriel Salas Chile
- Aníbal Guevara Ecuador.

=== Rafts ===
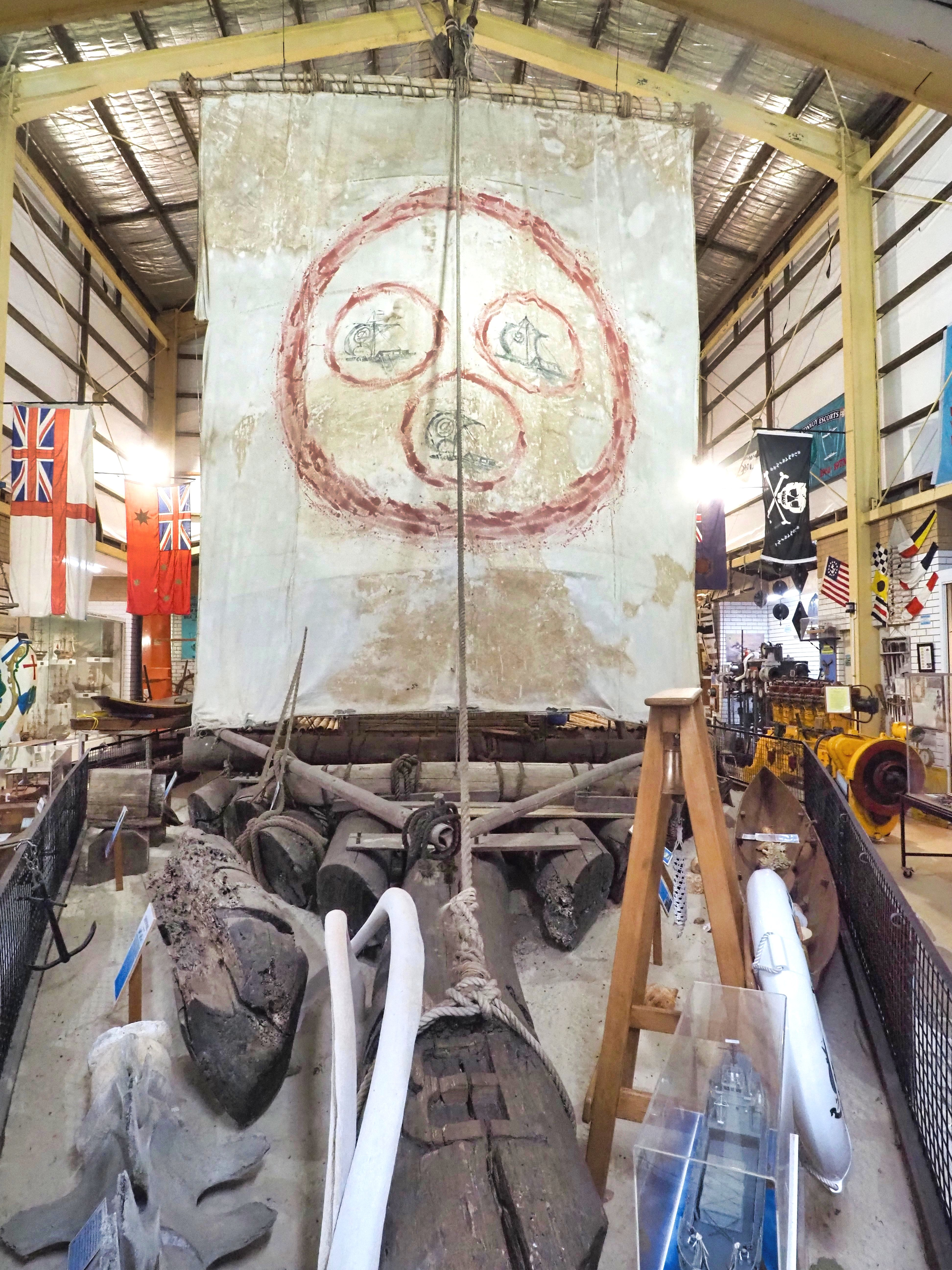
Las Balsas raft exhibit, Ballina Maritime Museum, frontal view of composite raft (from portions of "Mooloolaba" and "Aztlán")

The rafts were named "Guayaquil" for the point of departure, "Mooloolaba" for the intended point of arrival in Australia, and "Aztlán" for Mexico, the place where the expedition was organized. These rafts were replicas of the ones used by South American natives for centuries before Spanish explorers arrived in 1526.

The rafts were each 46 feet (14 m) long and 18 feet (5.5 m) wide. They were constructed with seven balsa wood logs which were cut down in the jungles of Ecuador from female trees during the full Moon when the sap content was at its optimum thus ensuring its resistance to saturation by sea water. They were then floated down river to the naval base at Guayaquil for construction. The rafts are entirely built from wood with wooden pegs and sisal ropes for rigging, in its construction, it did not use any metallic elements such as cables or nails. They were not capable of turning around when being carried by currents. They could maneuver with the use of centerboards: short planks between the logs called "guayas". The construction proved very stable on the water, with very little roll in sea conditions.

They carried enough water for a few weeks and after that they had to rely on rain water, collected in buckets. Clearing the logs of seaweed and slime became one of the essential daily tasks. The rafts were stocked with rice, beans and some preserves, but the main food source was seafood caught on the way – tuna, mahi-mahi and small pilot fish. Fish was abundant in the water surrounding the rafts, once a localised marine food chain had been established, with barnacles attached to the raft at the bottom of the chain. Twice the crew had to kill sharks, as they were scaring food away, while on another occasion one raft was pulled around as an unnoticed hammerhead shark took some bait on a line. The subject of food became a fixation for the crew. In the hot weather each man had to drink a pint of sea water each day to compensate for the lack of salt from dehydration. Each raft had a short range radio for use in emergency and enabled them to contact land every third day.

=== Journey ===
On 27 May 1973, setting sail from Guayaquil, Ecuador they commenced their drift across the Pacific Ocean via the Galapagos Islands, The Society Islands, The Cook Islands, Tonga, south of New Caledonia, and then saw land close to Mooloolaba, Queensland. Near Tonga they had to endure a particularly violent storm lasting eight days.

In order to avoid the rafts being damaged by the surf during landing, the expedition accepted the offer of a tow by HMAS Labuan as they approached the coast. While under tow, a storm hit, and five miles from the shore it was decided for safety reasons to release Guayaquil, its crew being taken aboard the Navy ship. The remaining two rafts were then landed in Ballina, New South Wales.

They arrived in Ballina on 21 November 1973. After 14,000 kilometres (8,700 mi) and 179 days at sea the crews were given a heroes' welcome by the people of Ballina. All three rafts had managed to stay within sight of each other during most of the trip. One had become damaged and separated in a storm, and with only radio communication from the two to the one, the group didn't regain visible contact until a week later.

Left to drift, the remains of Guayaquil were eventually found by fishermen close to Newcastle. They were later burned as scrap.

=== In the media ===
A documentary chronicling the expedition was subsequently produced, titled The Pacific Challenge. The film is distributed by the Ballina Maritime Museum. Las Balsas was the subject of an 11-minute radio documentary as part of the Witness series on the BBC's World Service in January 2014, which featured interviews from Mike Fitzgibbons and Gabriel Salas.

=== Museum and surviving raft ===
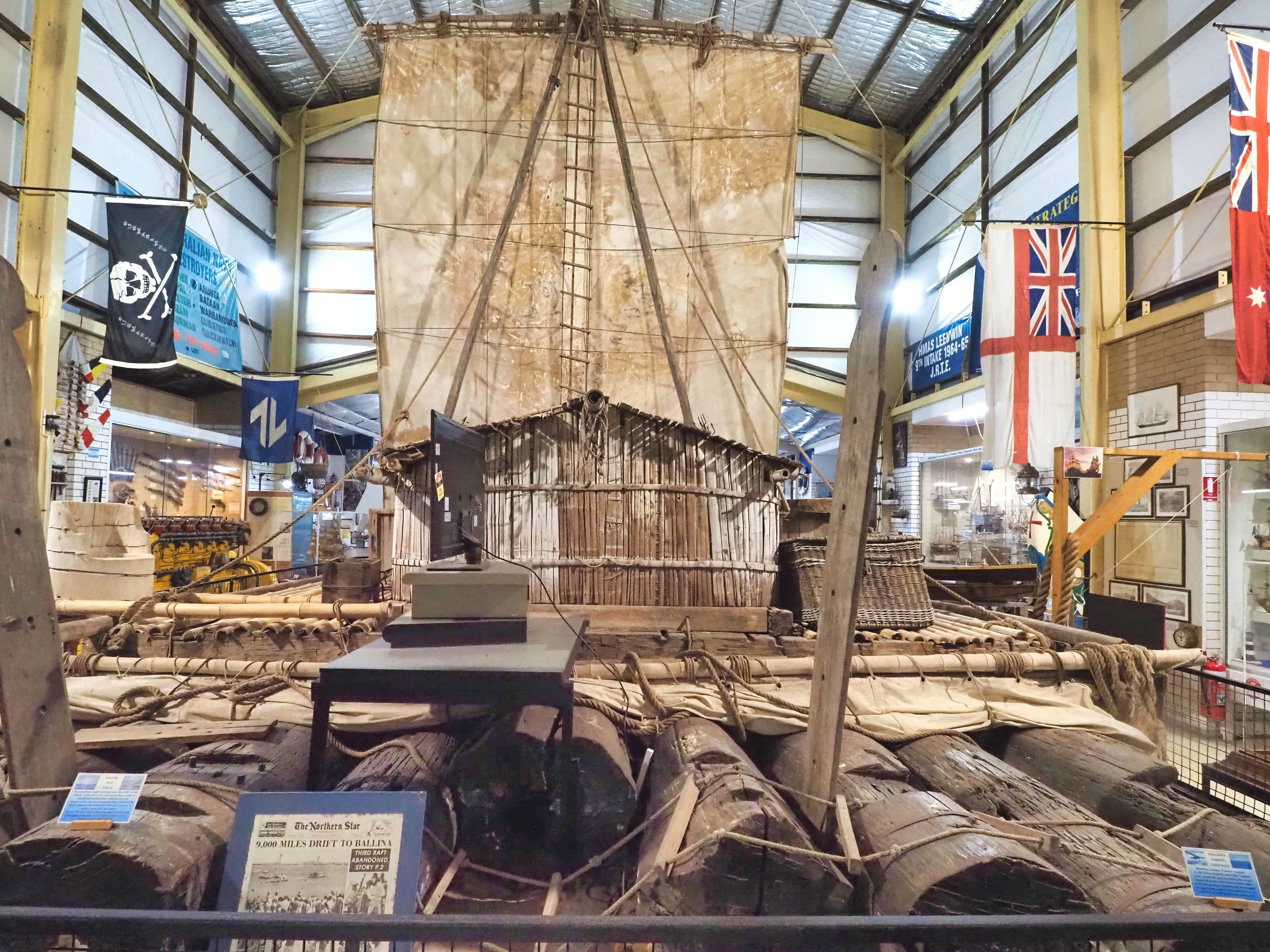
Las Balsas raft exhibit, Ballina Maritime Museum, rear view of composite raft

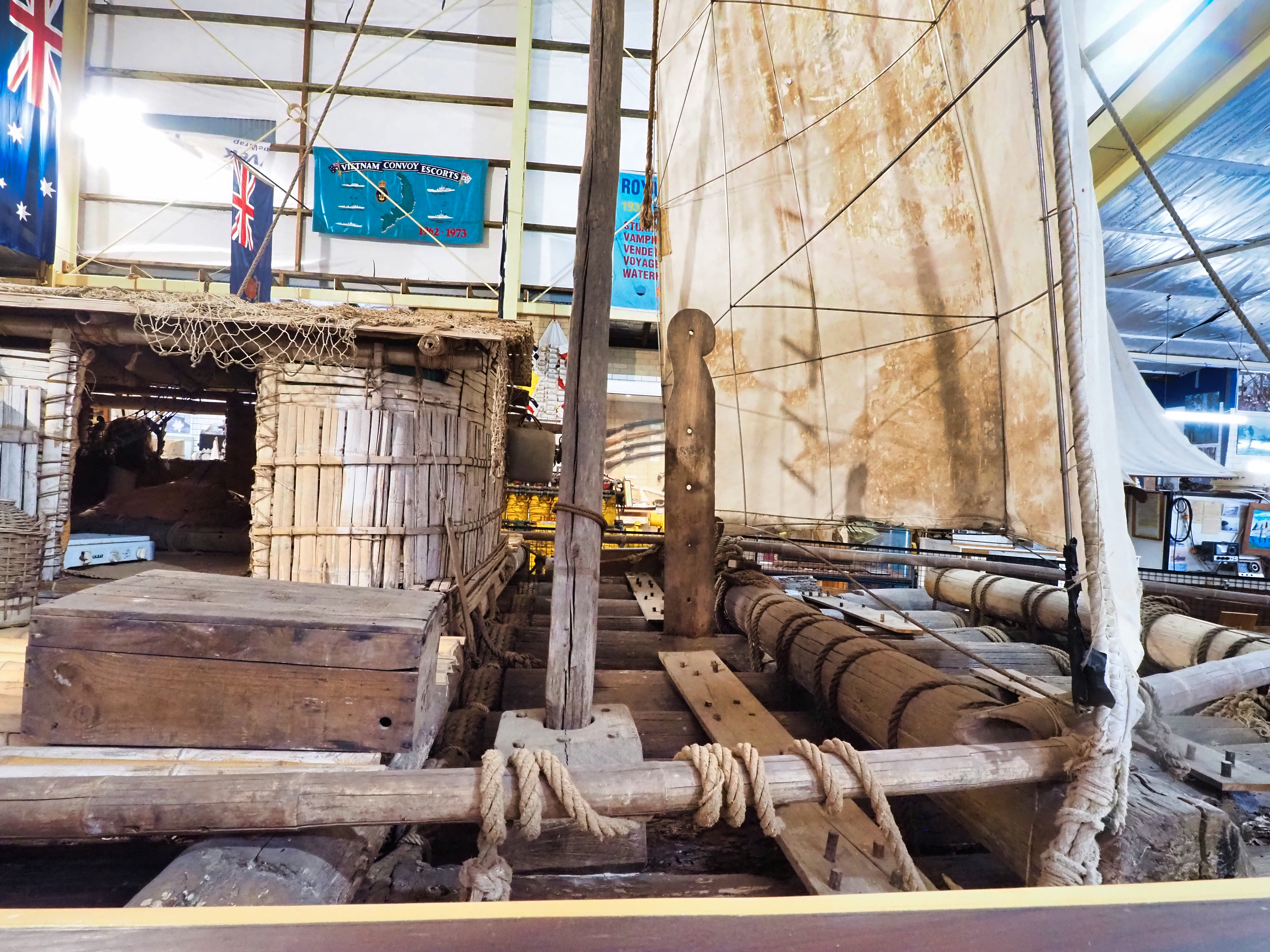
Las Balsas raft exhibit, Ballina Maritime Museum, side view of composite raft

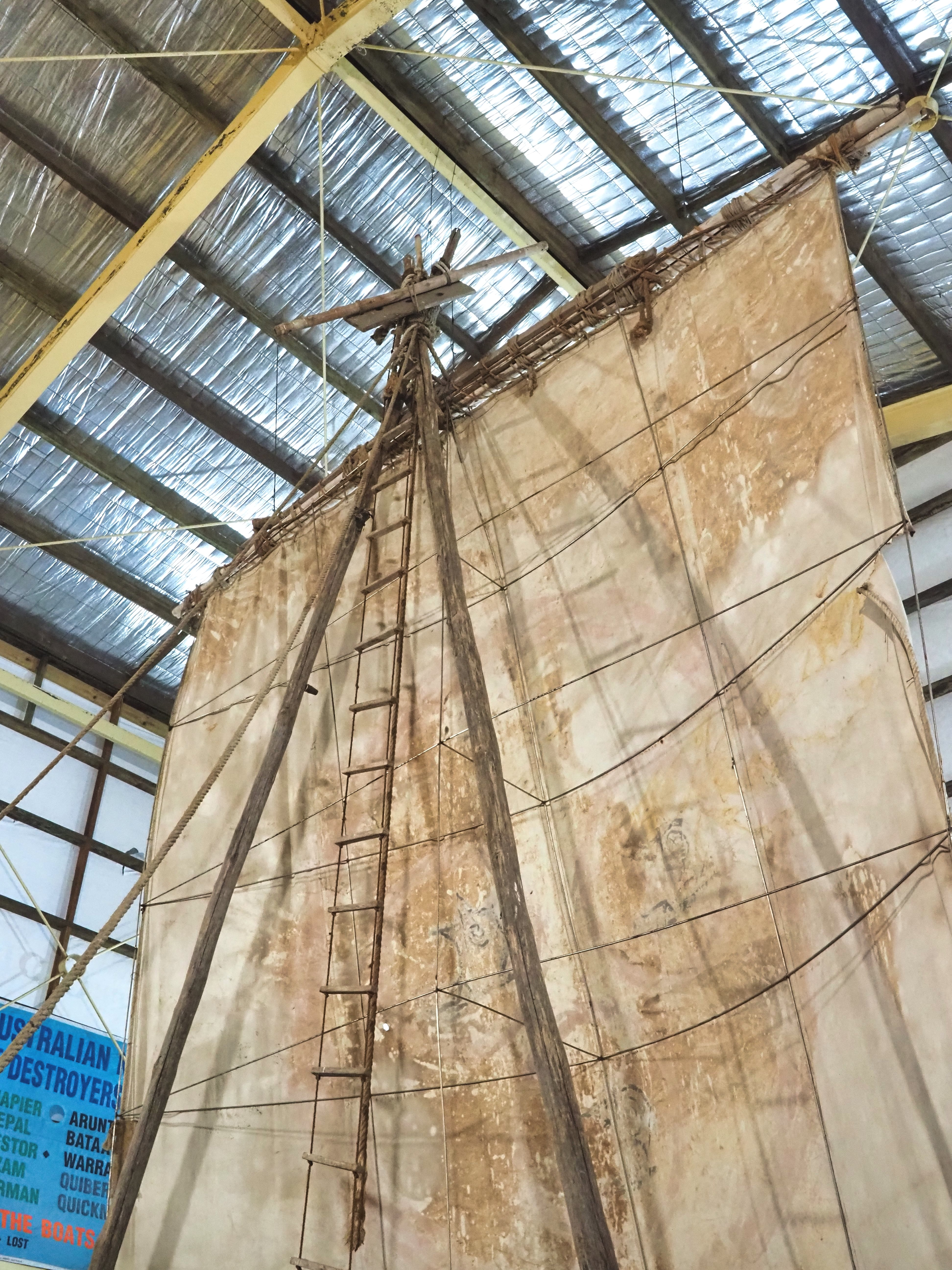
Las Balsas raft exhibit, Ballina Maritime Museum, detail of sail and rigging

The Mooloolaba and Aztlán were moored on the Richmond River, although they began to break apart as the hemp ropes disintegrated. As crew and supporters returning to re-tie them, it was discovered that Mooloolaba had largely disintegrated, with her mast, sail and many of her logs having floated away. the Aztlán was secured, and given a place on dry land a few months later by the Ballina Shire Council.

A few years later, the Council built a museum, the Ballina Naval & Maritime Museum next to their Information Centre. Installed inside was a display raft, built from the best parts of the remaining two rafts. Also included was a memorabilia dedicated to aviator Sir Charles Kingsford Smith. Each year thousands of world travelers are able to see this exhibition and marvel at this exploit of twelve men.

=== Legacy ===
After initial attention, the voyages became largely forgotten, despite some in the media comparing it to the feats of early pioneers such as Charles Lindbergh or Edmund Hillary, in addition to that of the Kon-Tiki. The crew have expressed regret at this situation, speculating that if their craft had ended up in a museum in a large city like Oslo (location of the Kon-Tiki), more would remember it, while at the same time also not wishing the surviving raft to be moved from its landing location. The museum curator agrees, but also put it down to the Australian tendency toward understatement.

A 40th anniversary celebration has occurred at the museum in November 2013. It saw some members of the crew reunited for the first time since the voyage.

== See also ==
- Pre-Columbian trans-oceanic contact
- Pre-Columbian rafts
- Ballina Naval & Maritime Museum
- William Willis (traveller) – solo rafting expeditions across oceans
- Tim Severin
