= SS Wollongbar =

SS Wollongbar is the name of the following ships:

- SS Wollongbar (1911)
- SS Wollongbar (1922)

== See also ==
- Wollongbar
