= Old School Museum =

Coordinates: 36.8862°S 149.9120°E

The Old School Museum is a local-history museum in Merimbula, New South Wales, Australia, occupying the town's former schoolhouse.

In 1869 the Rev. William Thom, a Presbyterian minister, was appointed to the Twofold Bay charge, residing at Pambula. His wife (Clarinda Menie) was the eldest daughter of Sir Henry Parkes and both were ardent supporters of public education. Pambula already had a well established school but the Rev. and Mrs. Thom felt there was an urgent need for more schools in the district. It is known that Mrs Thom made a private approach to her father on the matter and received a sympathetic response. Formal application for a school at Merimbula was made to the Council of Education in October, 1869, signed by the Rev. W. Thom, Adam K. Page and Armstrong L. Munn. Parents undertook to pay one third of the cost of a building. School began in temporary premises in 1870. The stone building still standing in Main Street, on land donated by Sir William Montagu Manning, was first used on 8 October 1875 and is believed to be one of only three schools comprising both classrooms and a teacher's residence remaining in New South Wales.

In 1875, the enrollment was 39 children. School fees were set by the local board within limits specified in the legislation. Initially parents paid a weekly fee of 9 pence for the first child and 6 pence for each additional child, but in 1893 this was reduced to 3 pence per head per week, with a maximum of 9 pence per family. According to the Public Instruction Act of 1880, fees should have changed in 1880 to the new limits of 3 pence per child with a maximum of a shilling per family. The building was vacated at the end of 1945, and the school reopened in new premises, which have been enlarged over the years. The residence was repaired and leased for accommodation, and the schoolroom was used for community purposes for a number of years.

The building was eventually abandoned. In 1969 the Merimbula-Imlay Historical Society was formed and requested permission to use the building as a museum, which after extensive repairs was opened in 1973. The building is classified by the National Trust and is listed on the Register of the National Estate.
