= Montague Island Light =

Lighthouse in New South Wales, Australia

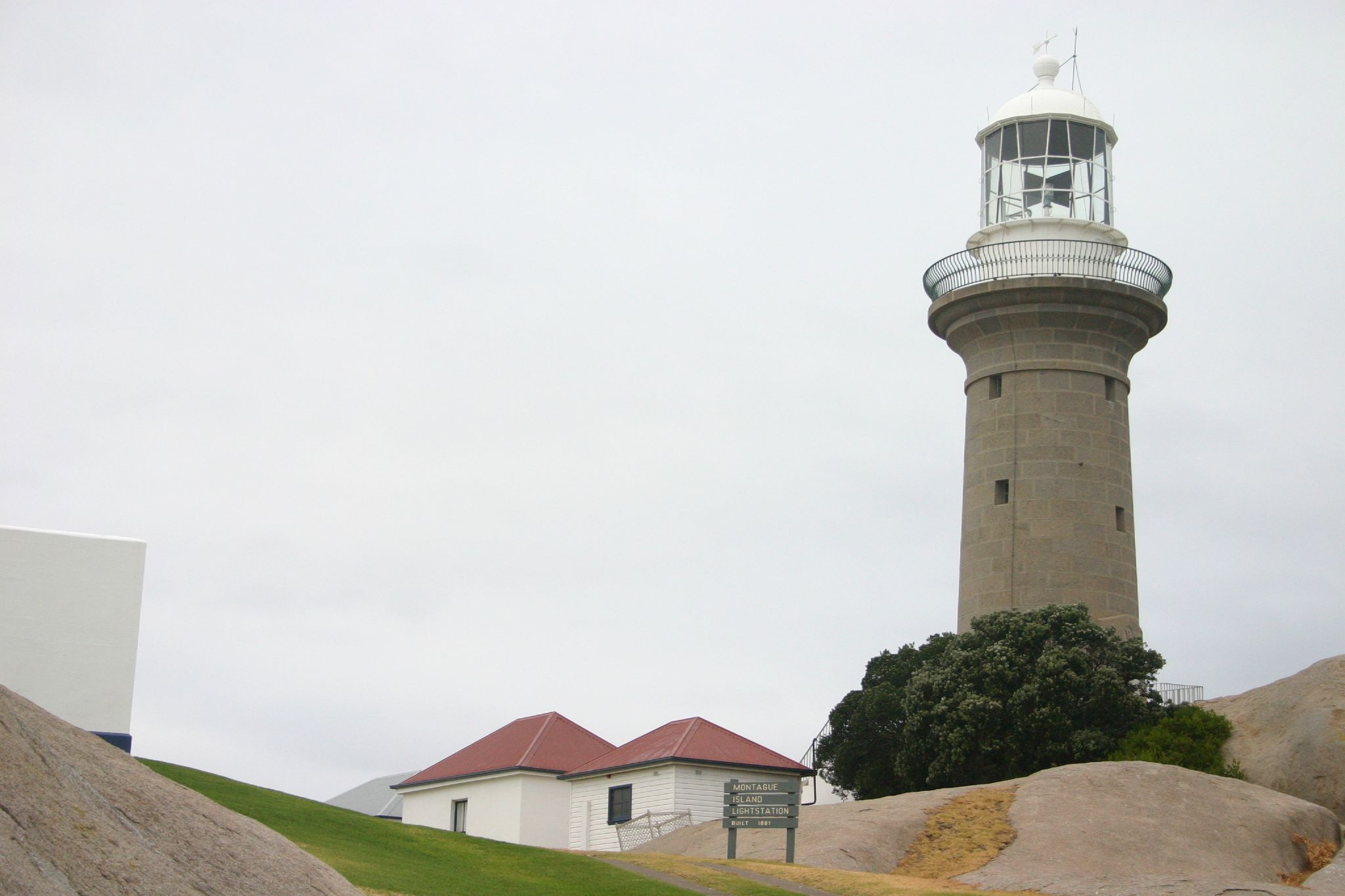
- Montague Island Light
- Location: Barunguba / Montague Island; New South Wales, Australia
- Coordinates: 36°15′7.15″S 150°13′35.19″E

Tower
- Constructed: 1881
- Construction: Granite tower
- Automated: 1986
- Height: 69 feet (21 m)
- Shape: Cylindrical tower with balcony and lantern
- Markings: Grey tower, white lantern
- Operator: Australian Maritime Safety Authority
- Heritage: Heritage Act — State Heritage Register, listed on the Commonwealth Heritage List

Light
- Focal height: 262 feet (80 m)
- Lens: 1st order Fresnel lens
- Intensity: 120,000 cd
- Range: 20 nautical miles (37 km; 23 mi)
- Characteristic: Fl W 15s.

Montague Island Lightstation
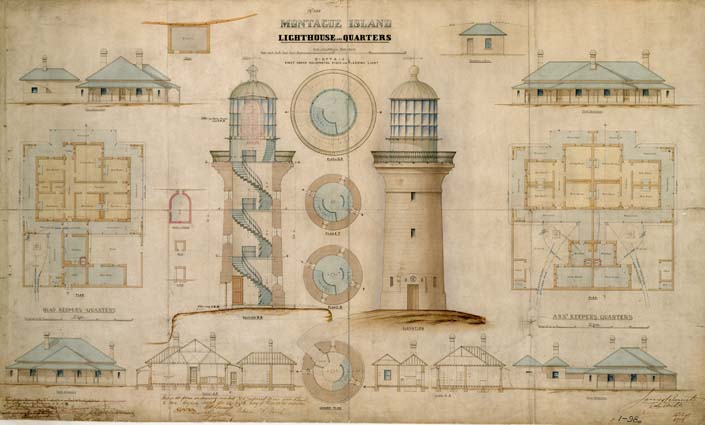
- Original plans for the Montague Island lighthouse, 1878.
- Interactive map of Montague Island Lightstation
- Location: Barunguba / Montague Island, Eurobodalla Shire, New South Wales, Australia

History
- Built: 1878–1881

Site notes
- Architects: James Barnet; NSW Colonial Architect
- Owner: NSW Office of Environment and Heritage

Commonwealth Heritage List
- Official name: Montague Island Lighthouse, Narooma, NSW, Australia
- Type: National heritage (Listed place)
- Designated: 22 June 2004
- Reference no.: 105601
- Class: Historic
- Place File No.: 1/08/271/0006

New South Wales Heritage Register
- Official name: Montague Island Lightstation; Montague Island Lightstation and its setting
- Type: State heritage (landscape)
- Designated: 2 April 1999
- Reference no.: 1000
- Type: Historic Landscape
- Category: Landscape – Cultural
- Builders: J. Musson; W.H. Jennings

The Montague Island Light is a heritage-listed active lighthouse located on Barunguba / Montague Island, an island in the Tasman Sea, 9 kilometres (5.6 mi) offshore from Narooma on the south coast of New South Wales, Australia. The lighthouse is located at the highest point of the island. It was designed by James Barnet and the New South Wales Colonial Architect and built from 1878 to 1881 by J. Musson and completed By W. H. Jennings. It is also known as the Montague Island Lightstation and its setting. The property is owned by the Office of Environment and Heritage, an agency of the Government of New South Wales. It was added to the New South Wales State Heritage Register on 2 April 1999, and the Commonwealth Heritage List on 22 June 2004.

== History ==
=== Indigenous heritage ===
The island has been associated with the Yuin Nation with the two groups the Walbunja and Djiringanj claiming title to the whole of the island. The island relates to a creation story mythology. Gulaga (Mount Dromedary) had two sons who travelled to the coast. The youngest, Najanuga was called back from the sea and became Najanuka (Little Dromedary) while the older of the two sons, Barunguba, went on into the sea and became the island. Barunguba, as the island was known, was a fertile hunting ground and has been associated with seasonal hunting for various birds, eggs, penguins and seals. The various peoples would go to the Island in their bark canoes. Legend has it that an estimated 150 Aboriginal people drowned in the early 1800s returning from one of these hunting expeditions. Two campsites or middens have been recorded on the Island and local information suggests that there may be other areas including a ceremonial ground. Most recently local groups have used the island for "men's business" and ceremonial purposes.

=== European history ===
In 1770 Captain James Cook sailed along the NSW coast. In his journal, he described a camel-shaped mountain which he called Mt Dromedary. Cook failed to recognise the island due to the distance from the coast, believing it to be a headland connected to Mt. Dromedary. In 1790 the convict ship Surprise established that Montague was an island during an inshore trip along the coast. It is possible that the island was named after George Montague Dunk, Earl of Halifax, during this voyage.

The island was visited several times by ship-wrecked sailors. During the mid-19th century gold rush at Nerrigundah, sea bird eggs were collected from Montague Island to sell to the miners at the Gulf Mine on Mt. Dromedary. As the foreign and coastal shipping trade to NSW developed in the mid-1800s, pressure increased for the installation of a navigation aid on Montague Island.

=== Development of the light station ===
The building of a "First Order Fixed and Flashing Light" was first decided in 1873, with finance approved in 1877 and tenders called in October 1878. In the Lighthouse Visitors book, James Barnet wrote that the initiation of the lighthouse dates from 1873 when a recommendation was made for the construction of a lighthouse on Montague (formerly Montagu) Island by a "Conference of the Principal Officers of the Marine Departments of the Australian Colonies" chaired by Captain Hixson. It was not until 1877 however that the NSW Government finally provided the necessary funds. Barnet writes that after a visit to the island to ascertain the best location for the light, plans were prepared and tenders invited in October 1878. The initial contractor, J. Musson, defaulted on the contract and in 1880 a second contractor, W. H. Jennings, took over the project and completed it ahead of schedule. Musson did not complete the construction due to financial problems. Problems started with an unauthorised blasting by the contractor that damaged the granite boulder selected as the base. As a result, the tower was repositioned several feet. After more difficulties and delay the contractor gave up the contract. In 1880 a temporary light was set up, and a new tender was given, with construction completing a year later in October 1881, 4 months early. The official lighting was on 1 November 1881. The light characteristic was a steady flare for 30s, then an eclipse for 13s, then a flash for 4s, then another eclipse of 13s, a total cycle of one minute. The power source was oil, though some reports say kerosene, and the light intensity was 45,000 cd. Its erection coming a little late for the collier, the Lady Darling which was wrecked on a reef just south of the Island in 1880. The light originally had a fixed and flashing mechanism which was upgraded in 1910, 1931 and in 1969 when the light was converted from oil to electricity.

The original lens and pedestal were removed and are now located in Narooma. The light is now solar powered. The residences consisting of Head Keeper's cottage and a duplex for two assistants and their families were constructed of rendered brick. Barnet describes them as "commodious and comfortably furnished" with "lofty" eleven-foot ceilings.

The irregularity of the weather hampered the supply of provisions and mail from the outset of the station. Keepers and their families had to rely on their own resources and this led to the early establishment of the gardens and fowl runs, milking cows, goats and rabbits as well as sea bird eggs. They depended on boats and rudimentary signalling systems for contact with the mainland. The isolation of the lightstation is emphasised by the graves of Charles Townsend and the two Burgess children. These deaths might possibly have been avoided if better communications had existed. It seems that steamers often did not see distress signals, and no a cable or signal station was supplied. In the mid-1890s it is recorded that a telephone link with Narooma was required.

The light was upgraded once in 1910 to an intensity of 250,000 cd, with the installation of a Douglas incandescent kerosene burner, and a second time in 1923 to an intensity of 357,000 cd. A Mercury bearings were installed in 1926 and the characteristic changed to a flash every 7.5 sec.

Trips to the island by locals and tourists for picnicking, fishing and shooting were popular from the earliest European settlement on the adjacent coast until 1953. During the 1890s several large public excursions were undertaken with up to 200 people at a time taken for picnics on the island.

After some debate and lapse of time, a radio transceiver with pedal-generator was supplied in January 1939. This system also had its problems and telephones finally arrived with electrification in 1950 however it is not known if this was linked to the mainland or was only within the complex. In 1933 "big game" fishing began in Australia when a black marlin was caught off Montague Island. Several fishing shacks dating from the 1930s are believed to have existed on the western shore of the Island, however, no evidence remains of these structures.

During World War II the Royal Australian Navy operated a defence facility on the island. The footings of the two timber and fibro huts are located to the north of the lightstation and may be associated with submarine detection.

The lightstation buildings were re-roofed during the 1950s. The asbestos roof was installed, replacing the original heavy duty corrugated iron and later unglazed terracotta tiles. It appears that the overall roof profile was simplified with the main roof taken directly over the verandahs, however, it is not known if the old verandah roof framing was left under the new profile. In 1953 the island became a wildlife sanctuary under the control of the National Trust of Australia (NSW) making Montague the first official National Trust "property" in Australia. Members of the National Trust were regular visitors to the Island from the 1950s onwards, as were scientists from the CSIRO from the 1960s. In 1969 the light was electrified, with a diesel generator supplying the power, and the light intensity was raised to 1,000,000 cd. Four panels from Green Cape Lighthouse were fitted, changing the characteristic to one flash every 4.5s.

The first scientific visit to the island was by an amateur ornithologist, A. F. Basset Hull in 1907 and other visits followed, such as that of geologist Ida Browne in 1928. Throughout these visits, lighthouse operations continued. Staffing of the lighthouse continued until 1985. Montague remained staffed as it was deemed that the benefits derived from human presence were greater than the cost savings of automating the station.

=== Automation of the light station ===
In 1987, after full automation of the lighthouse, management of the Island was transferred to the NSW National Parks and Wildlife Service though the light tower was retained and operated by the Australian Maritime Safety Authority. In the following year, the Service conducted limited day tours to the Island in conjunction with Heritage Week. These were so popular that similar tours were conducted during the 1989/90 holiday period. The trial period proved successful and expressions of interest were sought to provide passenger service to the Island.

In 1990 the Island was dedicated as a nature reserve, apart from a small area containing the lighthouse, which remains under control of the Australian Maritime Safety Authority. The other light station buildings, keepers' quarters and sheds, are part of the nature reserve. Following the Maritime Services Board's lifting of restrictions and approval to conduct night passenger services across the Narooma Bar in 1991, evening tours of the Island began. By June 1993 a major works maintenance programme was completed involving repairs to the lightstation complex and associated historic facilities.

Public access to the island is now restricted to guided tours conducted by NSW NPWS staff in association with private tour operators.

The Australian Garden History Society (ACT, Monaro & Riverina Branch) had grant funding to restore the 1880s kitchen gardens on Montague Island, as an interpretive device to aid to visitors' understanding of the light station's history. The reinstatement was undertaken in late 2014 with eight timber raised bed frames installed by NPWS. Children from St Peter's School, Broulee have planted seeds per list in report in four of these beds.

=== Original lens – current display ===
The original lens was last used on 9 November 1986. It was replaced with an array of lightweight solar powered 12 V quartz halogen lamps radiating two beams of 120,000 cd, and a total power consumption of 75 W.

The original Fresnel lens was packed prism by prism in individual cases surrounded by expanding foam and sent to Sydney for storage. After public volunteering and fund collection for constructing a proper display, the lens was officially transferred back on 10 August 1990 to be displayed in the Lighthouse Museum at Narooma (36.2165°S 150.1275°E), where the lens and mechanism are currently displayed in a 5 metres (16 ft) tower. Visitors can coin-operate the display.

=== Light keepers ===
Name	Rank	Years
John Burgess	Head	1881–1898
Charles Townsend	Assistant	1894
Jock Cameron	Assistant	1920–1923
Jock Cameron	Head	1933–1935
Tom Paddon	Assistant	1932–1934
Albert Cottee	??	1942 – ?
Jack Carmody	Head	1960–1967
Bruce Conley	Head	1973–1980
John Short	Head	? – 1986

== Site operation ==
The light is operated by the Australian Maritime Safety Authority. The site is managed by the Office of Environment and Heritage as part of the Montague Island Nature Reserve.

== Description ==
The tower is constructed from interlocking granite blocks which were quarried on the island. It is fitted with a bronze handrail. There are at least two single-storey lighthouse keeper's houses.

Context

Montague Island is 350 kilometres south of Sydney and approximately 9 kilometres offshore from Narooma. The Great Dividing Range forms the mainland backdrop to scenic coastal formations including beaches and rocky headlands. Large areas of natural value in the Narooma district are conserved in its National Parks and Reserves including the Deua, Wadbilliga, Eurobodalla, Wallaga Lake, Biamanga, and Mimosa Rocks National Parks and Illawong and Broulee Island Nature Reserves. The adjacent mainland supports forestry, dairying and tourism. The Narooma coast is an important fishery used also for recreational fishing, boating and diving. Narooma retains the old pilot station the original link to the Island, now used by the Volunteer Coastal Patrol.

Setting

Montague Island, at eighty-two hectares, is the largest inshore island on the NSW coast. It is divided into two segments by a ravine running north – south. Originally the northern headland of a low isthmus extending from Cape Dromedary. It was isolated by rising sea levels. The island features rugged coastline with steep cliffs, especially on the eastern side. Landing is possible at only two locations in sheltered areas on the western side of the Island. Access by boat is governed by the sea conditions at the Narooma Bar and limited to about two days in every three.

Natural attributes

Montague Island, including the lightstation, is gazetted as a Nature Reserve under the NSW National Parks & Wildlife Service (NPWS) Act in recognition of its importance as a bird sanctuary, penguin rookery and fur seal colony. Its importance as a seabird breeding site imposes management priorities different to the other NPWS lighthouses. The vegetation has been modified by occupation, with the native vegetation now restricted to one metre in height whereas early photographs show shrubs and trees. The thirty-seven native species reflect its previous connection with the mainland. Exotic and grass species introduced by lightkeepers remain, with a mixture of introduced grasses introduced in 1916 for lawn now dominant. Rabbits and weed control remain as issues. Montague Island's marine environment is enriched by its proximity to the continental shelf and the warm Eastern Australian Current enhancing its value as an important nesting area for seabirds. It has the northernmost colony of the Australian fur seal and is the only haul-out site for this marine mammal along the NSW coast.

Cultural landscape

On the Island are the old jetty area, the new jetty site, the poultry shed/navy complex, the old garden area, the former rubbish disposal area and the graves site. The boat shed located at the top the boat ramp is a single roomed structure clad in weatherboard with corrugated iron gabled roof. Double hung doors lead to the ramp and there is a small opening in the back wall. A cement mounting block remains as evidence of the former winch and cable that was used to haul vessels up the ramp. The shed is currently used to house NPWS equipment. In a small bay in the south west of the island are the remains of the old jetty and slipway with all timberwork missing. The only landing area is in Jetty Bay on the western side of the Island. It consists of a concrete platform with heavy timber frame and rubber buffers.

The jetty is reached by a ramp of rock and concrete leading from the boatshed. Adjacent to the Jetty platform is a tubular steel, hydraulic crane. To the south of the complex are the graves of keeper Charles Townsend and of John and Isabella Burgess, the children of head keeper Mr Burgess. These date from the late 19th century. Walking tracks and trails include the jetty track, the graves track, old wharf track and the old garden track. The garden site is northeast of Jetty Bay and retains its fenced enclosure, shed frames and garden plot mounds. The date of construction is unknown but it is evident in 1937 photographs. In 1990, a well continually fed by an underground spring was located, associated with the garden. The gardens themselves are overgrown with kikuyu grass.

Other elements include the quarry, the Navy hut ruin, site of the chicken sheds to the north of the complex, the tractor shed (often referred to as the stables), rubbish tips and the like. A small roped off area adjacent to the boatshed at the top end of the jetty ramp acts as the penguin viewing area. It provides seating in a position with a view of the penguins as they land on the rock shelf to the southwest of the jetty. A wooden staircase located on the eastern side of the island was constructed by one of the former lightkeepers to facilitate fishing. The stairs are in poor condition and of minor significance. A helipad is located on the eastern side of the Island and is for emergency use.

Lighthouse site description

The precinct is situated high on the southern, larger segment of the Island and the lighthouse rises prominently from a large granite boulder on the eastern side of the precinct. It is a structure with an affinity with its setting, partly due to its construction of granite quarried from the Island.

The complex includes the lighthouse tower, residences, brick and weatherboard store buildings; and communications mast. Sections of the original flagstaff remain standing.

Materials and construction

The quarry for the granite tower is located nearby to the immediate northeast of the buildings. The foundation stone for the Sydney GPO came from here. The tower sits on a large granite boulder and tapers for 12 metres in dressed granite blocks up to the gallery and lantern enclosure. Around the upper platform is a gently curved balustrade made of gunmetal. The residences, consisting of Head Keeper's cottage and a duplex for two assistants and their families, were constructed of brick rendered internally and externally. A similar construction is used for the service wings containing kitchens, laundries and store areas. The timber floor boarding is fixed using an unusual slip jointing technique. Roofs were originally clad in galvanised iron over Baltic pine lining. Roofing was replaced in 1901–02 with tiles. In 1959 the tiles were replaced with corrugated asbestos sheets. The dwellings each have verandahs with timber posts.

Buildings and structures

The Lightstation complex consists of the Light Tower, Head Keeper's cottage, Assistant's duplex and a number of associated store and functional buildings, elements and features.

The lighthouse still operates as the AMSA navigational aid. A flight of granite steps leads to the base of the tower. The tower is entered from a door on the north west, this being the most sheltered side. It is divided into three storeys by cast iron floors connected with a spiral prefabricated cast iron staircase which continues up to the lantern. The gallery uses wide angled decorative balustrades.

Head Keeper's Cottage

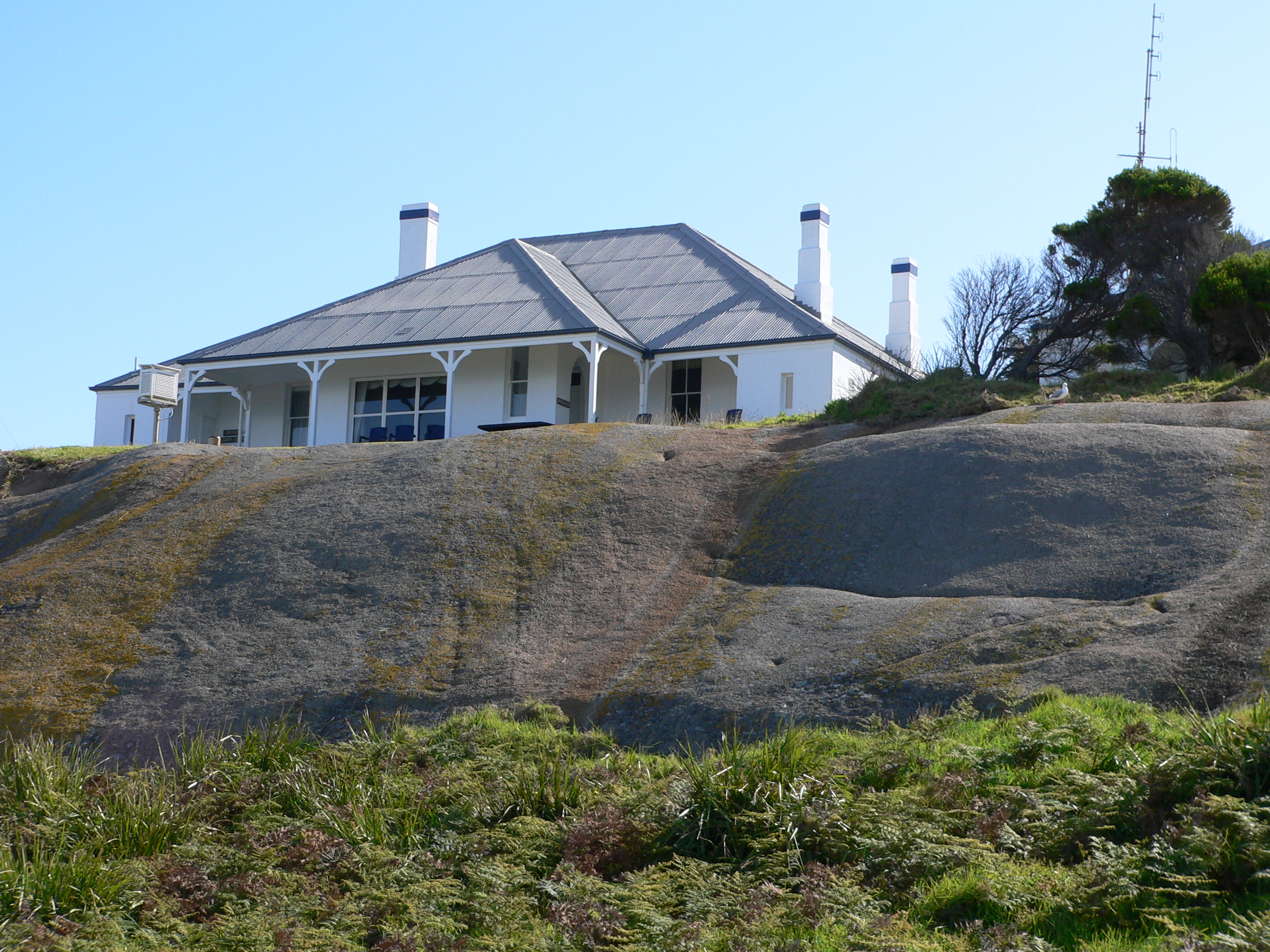
Montague island Lighthouse keepers cottage, 2005

The Head Keeper's Cottage on the south east of the lighthouse consists of a T plan main building with eight rooms connected by halls. It is surrounded by verandahs. A small infill on the western verandah connects to the service wing containing kitchen and laundry areas. The main building and service wing enclose a courtyard area with an underground water tank and cement flagged finish. There are fireplaces in the main rooms with cast iron surrounds painted black and fitted with grates. Internally, cedar trims and detailing survive, together with built in cedar cupboards either side of the fireplace of some rooms

Assistant Keeper's Cottages, 1881

The duplex is symmetrical about the central party wall. Each is L-shaped and consists of four rooms with a central corridor. The duplexes are surrounded by verandahs with the characteristic corner windbreaks and have detached service wings. Cement rendered externally and internally, the duplexes have cast iron fireplaces in the main rooms, together with built in storage units at the sides. Internal finishes included timber floors, cedar trims and mouldings.

Minor structures

A number of small structures and buildings around the lighthouse precinct generally fulfil their original support and storage functions. A rendered brick structure (formerly the oilstore, now the generator room) and a weatherboard store stand adjacent to the base of the tower. These have hipped roofs of painted corrugated steel

Lantern equipment

The lantern was manufactured by Chance Bros of Birmingham. The light is a First Order diotropic fixed and flashing light which was originally powered by oil. It was converted to electricity in 1950 and finally fully automated in 1986 using solar power.

=== Condition ===
As at 4 July 2014, good physical condition retaining essential features and characteristics. High integrity, removed lens conserved on mainland.

=== Modifications and dates ===
Changes to the setting includes introduced plants and animals. The headstones to the graves were inappropriately treated with a sealant some time ago and have deteriorated more quickly than expected. The carved messages have been reproduced on an adjacent interpretive marker. Alterations to buildings include new kitchens and bathroom fittings have been placed in the cottage. Verandah enclosures occurred at various times. The infill of the verandahs on the western side of the buildings had occurred by 1932. The internal linings were then replaced with asbestos cement sheet and in the 1960s by masonite sheeting. Alterations to equipment include when the lantern was changed to solar power in 1986, the original lens and pedestal were removed and are now located at the Museum in Narooma. The solar panels are mounted on the granite boulder to the north of the lighthouse. The original flagstaff is now used as a radio aerial. A number of other radio aerials on the island provide enhanced reception back towards the NSW South Coast. Conservation works include by June 1993 a major works maintenance programme was completed involving repairs to the lightstation complex and associated historic facilities. The program comprised nine individual projects including roof and gutter repairs, kitchen renovations, aerial mast purchase and installation, floor restoration, track and quarry stabilisation, restoration carpentry, painting of the lightstation and facilities, stabilisation works to the graves, and plumbing and water system upgrades.

== Heritage listing ==
Montague Island Lightstation was listed on the New South Wales State Heritage Register on 2 April 1999 with the following statement of significance:

Montague Island Lightstation and its setting are highly significant as one of a collection of lighthouses which combine the natural values of a rugged coastal island with the cultural values of a prominent landmark and isolated outpost associated with the development of coastal shipping in the late 19th century.

— New South Wales State Heritage Register

The site was added to the Commonwealth Heritage List on 22 June 2004.

== See also ==
- List of lighthouses in Australia
