= HMAS Kapunda =

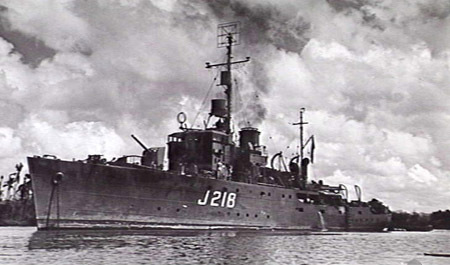
- HMAS Kapunda

History

Australia
- Namesake: Town of Kapunda, South Australia
- Builder: Poole & Steel
- Laid down: 27 August 1941
- Launched: 23 June 1942
- Commissioned: 21 October 1942
- Decommissioned: 14 January 1946
- Motto: Protect And Avenge
- Honours and awards: Battle honours: Pacific 1942–44; New Guinea 1943–44
- Fate: Sold for scrap in 1961
- Badge

General characteristics
- Class & type: Bathurst-class corvette
- Displacement: 1,025 tons (full war load)
- Length: 186 ft (57 m)
- Beam: 31 ft (9.4 m)
- Draught: 8.5 ft (2.6 m)
- Propulsion: Triple expansion engine, 2 shafts, 1,800 hp
- Speed: 15.5 knots (28.7 km/h; 17.8 mph)
- Complement: 77
- Armament: 1 × 4 inch Mk XIX gun; 3 × 20 mm Oerlikon guns; Depth charge chutes and throwers

HMAS Kapunda (J218/M218), named for the town of Kapunda, South Australia, was one of 60 Bathurst-class corvettes constructed during World War II, and one of 36 initially manned and commissioned solely by the Royal Australian Navy (RAN).

== Design and construction ==
In 1938, the Australian Commonwealth Naval Board (ACNB) identified the need for a general purpose 'local defence vessel' capable of both anti-submarine and mine-warfare duties, while easy to construct and operate. The vessel was initially envisaged as having a displacement of approximately 500 tons, a speed of at least 10 knots (19 km/h; 12 mph), and a range of 2,000 nautical miles (3,700 km; 2,300 mi) The opportunity to build a prototype in the place of a cancelled Bar-class boom defence vessel saw the proposed design increased to a 680-ton vessel, with a 15.5 knots (28.7 km/h; 17.8 mph) top speed, and a range of 2,850 nautical miles (5,280 km; 3,280 mi), armed with a 4-inch gun, equipped with asdic, and able to fitted with either depth charges or minesweeping equipment depending on the planned operations: although closer in size to a sloop than a local defence vessel, the resulting increased capabilities were accepted due to advantages over British-designed mine warfare and anti-submarine vessels. Construction of the prototype HMAS Kangaroo did not go ahead, but the plans were retained. The need for locally built 'all-rounder' vessels at the start of World War II saw the "Australian Minesweepers" (designated as such to hide their anti-submarine capability, but popularly referred to as "corvettes") approved in September 1939, with 60 constructed during the course of the war: 36 (including Kapunda) ordered by the RAN, 20 ordered by the British Admiralty but manned and commissioned as RAN vessels, and 4 for the Royal Indian Navy.

Kapunda was laid down by Poole & Steel at Balmain, New South Wales on 27 August 1941. She was launched on 23 June 1942 by Mary Quirk, the Member for Balmain in the New South Wales Legislative Assembly, and was commissioned into the RAN on 21 October 1942.

== Operational history ==
Kapunda entered service as a convoy escort along the east coast of Australia. Initially operating between Sydney and Brisbane, she was reassigned to the Queensland-New Guinea run in March 1943. Kapunda fired in anger for the first time during March, when eight Japanese bombers and twelve Japanese fighter aircraft attacked a convoy escorted by Kapunda and sister ship Bendigo. Anti-aircraft fire from the two corvettes drove the aircraft off. On 12 April, a convoy under escort by the corvette was attacked by a formation of 37 Japanese aircraft. Several aircraft were destroyed by combined fire from Kapunda and the merchant ships, but the merchantman MV Gorgon was successfully hit and started to burn. Kapunda manoeuvred alongside the damaged ship and sent firefighting parties aboard, extinguishing the flames and helping Gorgon to proceed to port.

On 1 April 1944, the corvette was redeployed to New Guinea. Kapunda was tasked with convoy escort, anti-submarine patrol, and shore bombardment duties, and remained in the area until October 1944, when she returned to Sydney for refit. After the refit concluded in late November, she returned to her duties in New Guinea, and with the exception of a brief docking in Darwin in June 1945, served in these roles until the end of World War II.

Following the war, Kapunda was used to assist the evacuation of Allied prisoners-of-war from Kuching, and was the venue for the signing of the surrender of Japanese forces in the Kuching area, with Major General Yamamura signing the instrument of surrender on board. Kapunda returned to Australian waters in November 1945.

The corvette received two battle honours for her wartime service: "Pacific 1942–45" and "New Guinea 1943–44".

== Decommissioning and fate ==
Kapunda was paid off into reserve on 14 January 1946. She was marked for disposal on 30 December 1960, and was sold on 6 January 1961 to Kinoshita (Australia) Pty Ltd for breaking up as scrap.
