= HMAS Maryborough (J195) =

1940 Bathurst-class corvette

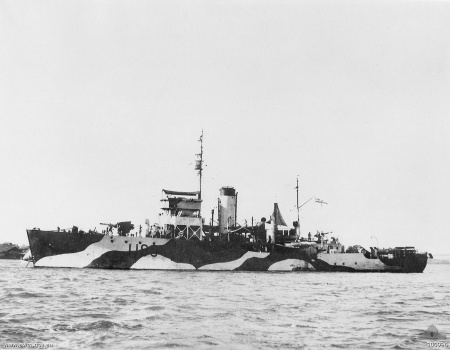
- HMAS Maryborough in Cochin, India in December 1942

History

Australia
- Namesake: City of Maryborough, Queensland
- Builder: Walkers Limited
- Laid down: 16 April 1940
- Launched: 17 October 1940
- Commissioned: 12 June 1941
- Decommissioned: December 1945
- Renamed: Isobel Queen (1947)
- Honours and awards: Battle honours: Pacific 1942; Indian Ocean 1942–44; Sicily 1943
- Fate: Sold to private ownership in 1947. Sold for scrap in 1953

General characteristics
- Class & type: Bathurst-class corvette
- Displacement: 650 tons (standard), 1,025 tons (full war load)
- Length: 185 ft 8 in (56.59 m)
- Beam: 31 ft (9.4 m)
- Draught: 8.5 ft (2.6 m)
- Propulsion: Triple expansion engine, 2 shafts
- Speed: 15 knots (28 km/h; 17 mph) at 1,750 hp
- Complement: 85
- Armament: 1 × 4 inch Mk XIX gun; 3 × Oerlikon 20 mm cannons

HMAS Maryborough (J195/B248/A122), named for the city of Maryborough, Queensland, was one of 60 Bathurst-class corvettes constructed during World War II, and one of 20 built on Admiralty order but manned by personnel of and commissioned into the Royal Australian Navy (RAN). She was the first naval vessel built in Queensland for the Royal Australian Navy during World War II.

== Design and construction ==
In 1938, the Australian Commonwealth Naval Board (ACNB) identified the need for a general purpose 'local defence vessel' capable of both anti-submarine and mine-warfare duties, while easy to construct and operate. The vessel was initially envisaged as having a displacement of approximately 500 tons, a speed of at least 10 knots (19 km/h; 12 mph), and a range of 2,000 nautical miles (3,700 km; 2,300 mi). The opportunity to build a prototype in the place of a cancelled Bar-class boom defence vessel saw the proposed design increased to a 680-ton vessel, with a 15.5 knots (28.7 km/h; 17.8 mph) top speed, and a range of 2,850 nautical miles (5,280 km; 3,280 mi), armed with a 4-inch gun, equipped with asdic, and able to fitted with either depth charges or minesweeping equipment depending on the planned operations: although closer in size to a sloop than a local defence vessel, the resulting increased capabilities were accepted due to advantages over British-designed mine warfare and anti-submarine vessels. Construction of the prototype HMAS Kangaroo did not go ahead, but the plans were retained. The need for locally built 'all-rounder' vessels at the start of World War II saw the "Australian Minesweepers" (designated as such to hide their anti-submarine capability, but popularly referred to as "corvettes") approved in September 1939, with 60 constructed during the course of the war: 36 ordered by the RAN, 20 (including Maryborough) ordered by the British Admiralty but manned and commissioned as RAN vessels, and 4 for the Royal Indian Navy.

Maryborough was constructed by Walkers Limited in Maryborough, Queensland. She was laid down on 16 April 1940, launched on 17 October 1940 by Mrs. A. Goldsmith, wife of the general manager of Walkers, and commissioned on 12 June 1941. Engineer Rear Admiral Percival E. McNeil, third member of the Naval Board, Commander E. C. Rhodes, District Naval Officer and Lieutenant-Commander N. S. Pixley attended as official party with the rector, St. Pauls Church of England, Mayborough, Rev. A. E. Taylor leading a religious service before launching.

== Operational history ==
The ship served a brief period on Australia's east coast before departing in November 1941 for Singapore, where she was assigned to the 21st Minesweeping Flotilla along with HMAS Burnie, Goulburn and Bendigo with the flotilla's commander, Commander Cant, in Maryborough. The flotilla was engaged in minesweeping, patrolling and escort duties throughout December.

After the fall of Singapore Maryborough and the flotilla, now including Toowoomba and Ballarat, were engaged in the defense of the Dutch East Indies, raiding oil refineries in Sumatra to deny them to the Japanese and patrolling the southern area of the Sunda Strait, in particular to prevent Japanese landings in small native craft, until 28 February when Commander Cant took the flotilla to Tjilatjap for replenishment. During the night orders came to return to the strait so that Maryborough and three other ships turned back but on 1 March Batavia was ordered evacuated and the ships, then about 50 miles east of Java Head headed again for Tjilatjap. There, as Java was evacuated, Commander Cant made space on his ships for about thirty passengers each and on the night of 2 March, the other ships already having left escorting evacuation ships, Maryborough departed escorting the Dutch ship SS Generaal Verspijck bound for Fremantle.

Those actions were followed by convoy duty in the South Atlantic to the Persian Gulf and involvement in raising the siege of Malta. From November 1942 until December 1944, Maryborough was assigned to the British Eastern Fleet.

For her wartime service, the corvette was awarded three battle honours: "Pacific 1942", "Indian Ocean 1942–44", and "Sicily 1943".

== Fate ==
Maryborough paid off in December 1945, and was sold to the Australian General Trading and Shipping Syndicate on 9 May 1947, who renamed her Isobel Queen. For years she was berthed near Victoria Bridge, Brisbane but never sailed under her own power after sale by the navy in 1947. She was later sold for scrap to Carr Enterprises in Brisbane, in 1953.
