= HMAS Wallaroo =

Coordinates: 31°54′24″S 114°37′31″E

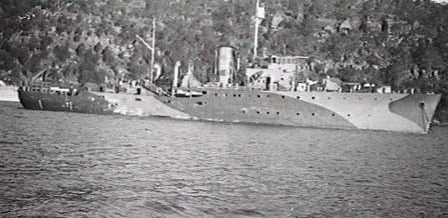
- Starboard side view of HMAS Wallaroo. She is painted in a two-tone grey camouflage.

History

Australia
- Namesake: Town of Wallaroo, South Australia
- Builder: Poole & Steel, Sydney
- Laid down: 24 April 1941
- Launched: 18 February 1942
- Commissioned: 15 July 1942
- Motto: "With Might And Main"
- Honours and awards: Battle honours: Pacific 1942
- Fate: Lost following collision on 11 June 1943
- Badge

General characteristics
- Class & type: Bathurst-class corvette
- Displacement: 650 tons (standard), 1,025 tons (full war load)
- Length: 186 ft (57 m)
- Beam: 31 ft (9.4 m)
- Draught: 8.5 ft (2.6 m)
- Propulsion: triple expansion engine, 2 shafts
- Speed: 15 knots (28 km/h; 17 mph) at 1,750 hp
- Complement: 85
- Armament: 1 × 4 inch Mk XIX gun; 3 × Oerlikon 20 mm cannons; machine guns; depth charge chutes and throwers

zHMAS Wallaroo (J222), named after the town of Wallaroo, South Australia, was one of 60 Bathurst-class corvettes constructed during World War II, and one of 36 initially manned and commissioned solely by the Royal Australian Navy (RAN). Wallaroo was one of only three Bathursts lost during World War II; following a collision with US Liberty ship Henry Gilbert Costin on the night of 11 June 1943.

== Design and construction ==
In 1938, the Australian Commonwealth Naval Board (ACNB) identified the need for a general purpose 'local defence vessel' capable of both anti-submarine and mine-warfare duties, while easy to construct and operate. The vessel was initially envisaged as having a displacement of approximately 500 tons, a speed of at least 10 knots (19 km/h; 12 mph), and a range of 2,000 nautical miles (3,700 km; 2,300 mi) The opportunity to build a prototype in the place of a cancelled Bar-class boom defence vessel saw the proposed design increased to a 680-ton vessel, with a 15.5 knots (28.7 km/h; 17.8 mph) top speed, and a range of 2,850 nautical miles (5,280 km; 3,280 mi), armed with a 4-inch gun, equipped with asdic, and able to fitted with either depth charges or minesweeping equipment depending on the planned operations: although closer in size to a sloop than a local defence vessel, the resulting increased capabilities were accepted due to advantages over British-designed mine warfare and anti-submarine vessels. Construction of the prototype HMAS Kangaroo did not go ahead, but the plans were retained. The need for locally built 'all-rounder' vessels at the start of World War II saw the "Australian Minesweepers" (designated as such to hide their anti-submarine capability, but popularly referred to as "corvettes") approved in September 1939, with 60 constructed during the course of the war: 36 (including Wallaroo) ordered by the RAN, 20 ordered by the British Admiralty but manned and commissioned as RAN vessels, and 4 for the Royal Indian Navy.

Wallaroo was laid down by Poole & Steel in Sydney on 24 April 1941. She was launched on 18 February 1942 by Mrs Poole, wife of the shipyard's Chairman of Directors, and commissioned on 15 July 1942.

== Operational history ==
Wallaroo entered service in September 1942, patrolling between Adelaide in South Australia and Fremantle in Western Australia for submarines, as well as performing escort and minesweeping duties around Fremantle.

Just after midnight on 11 June 1943, while out to sea west of Fremantle, the corvette collided with United States Liberty Ship Henry Gilbert Costin. The night was overcast, and the ships were travelling without lights as a precaution against attacks. Three of Wallaroo's crew were killed in the collision, and the corvette sank four hours later with no further casualties while trying to reach Fremantle. The Liberty Ship received minor damage, and made it to port.

The corvette's wartime service was recognised with the battle honour "Pacific 1942".
