= HMAS Bendigo (J187) =

1941 Bathurst-class corvette

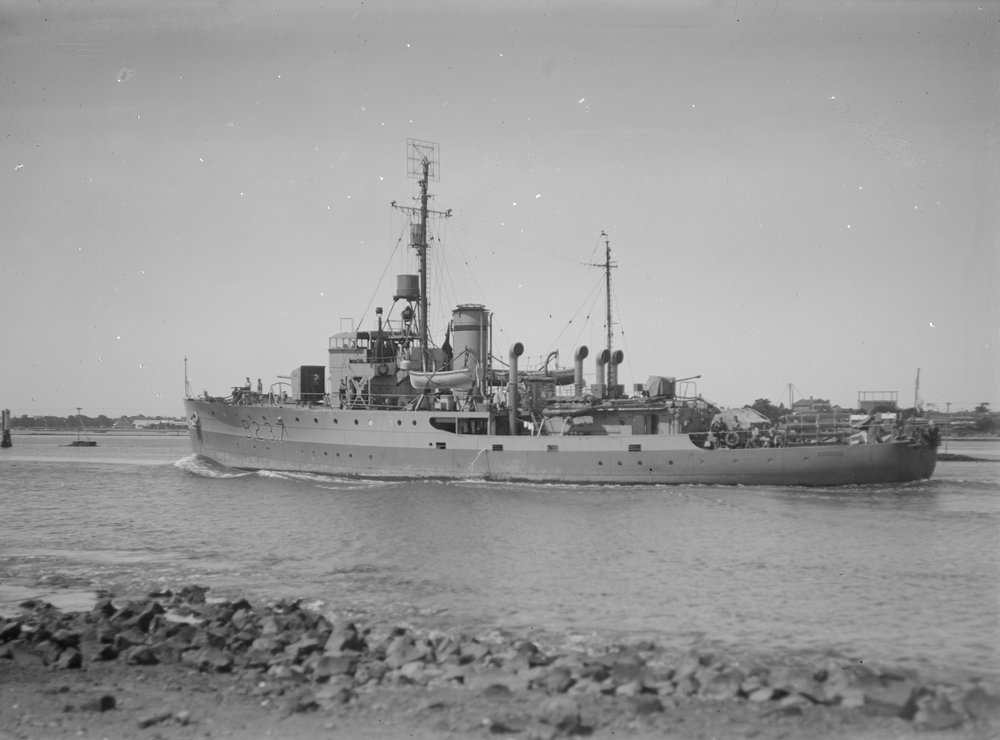
- HMAS Bendigo

History

Australia
- Namesake: City of Bendigo, Victoria
- Builder: Cockatoo Docks and Engineering Company
- Laid down: 12 August 1940
- Launched: 1 March 1941
- Commissioned: 10 May 1941
- Decommissioned: 27 September 1946
- Motto: "Advance with Purpose"
- Honours and awards: Battle honours: Pacific 1942–45; New Guinea 1942–44; Okinawa 1945
- Fate: Sold to a Chinese company as a civilian vessel, later absorbed into PLAN
- Badge

People's Republic of China
- Name: Luoyang
- Namesake: Luoyang
- Acquired: 1949
- Commissioned: 1949
- Decommissioned: 1988
- Fate: Scrapped after retirement

General characteristics
- Class & type: Bathurst-class corvette
- Displacement: 590 tonnes (standard)
- Length: 56.69 m (186 ft 0 in)
- Beam: 9.45 m (31 ft 0 in)
- Draught: 2.59 m (8 ft 6 in)
- Propulsion: triple expansion engine, 2 shafts
- Speed: 15 knots (28 km/h; 17 mph)
- Complement: 85
- Armament: 1 × 4-inch Mk XIX gun; 3 × Oerlikon 20 mm cannons; Machine guns; Depth charges chutes and throwers

The first HMAS Bendigo (J187/B237/A111) was a Bathurst-class minesweeper, a group commonly known as corvettes and including escort and patrol duties along with minesweeping.

== Design and construction ==
In 1938, the Australian Commonwealth Naval Board (ACNB) identified the need for a general purpose 'local defence vessel' capable of both anti-submarine and mine-warfare duties, while easy to construct and operate. The vessel was initially envisaged as having a displacement of approximately 500 tons, a speed of at least 10 knots (19 km/h; 12 mph), and a range of 2,000 nautical miles (3,700 km; 2,300 mi) The opportunity to build a prototype in the place of a cancelled Bar-class boom defence vessel saw the proposed design increased to a 680-ton vessel, with a 15.5 knots (28.7 km/h; 17.8 mph) top speed, and a range of 2,850 nautical miles (5,280 km; 3,280 mi), armed with a 4-inch gun, equipped with asdic, and able to fitted with either depth charges or minesweeping equipment depending on the planned operations: although closer in size to a sloop than a local defence vessel, the resulting increased capabilities were accepted due to advantages over British-designed mine warfare and anti-submarine vessels. Construction of the prototype HMAS Kangaroo did not go ahead, but the plans were retained. The need for locally built 'all-rounder' vessels at the start of World War II saw the "Australian Minesweepers" (designated as such to hide their anti-submarine capability, but popularly referred to as "corvettes") approved in September 1939, with 60 constructed during the course of the war: 36 (including Bendigo) ordered by the RAN, 20 ordered by the British Admiralty but manned and commissioned as RAN vessels, and 4 for the Royal Indian Navy.

Bendigo was laid down by the Cockatoo Docks and Engineering Company at Cockatoo Island Dockyard in Sydney, New South Wales on 12 August 1940, launched on 1 March 1941 by Dame Mary Hughes, wife of the Minister for the Navy, and commissioned on 10 May 1941.

== Operational history ==
HMAS Bendigo departed Sydney 4 July 1941 for two months operation in the Darwin area before departing 22 September and joining the corvettes HMAS Burnie, HMAS Goulburn and HMAS Maryborough forming the 21st Minesweeping Flotilla of Royal Navy's China Squadron based at Singapore on 24 November 1941 and where she was located on 8 December 1941 when the Pacific War began.

=== Singapore ===
During January 1942 Bendigo operated from Singapore in sweeping, escort and patrol as far south as the Berhala and Banka Straits until anchoring in Singapore on 30 January and remaining in the harbour until 6 February during which Japanese bombers were overhead daily and near misses scarred the hull with shrapnel. On 5 February only Bendigo and HMAS Wollongong, another ship of the flotilla, were at Singapore with the rest having shifted operations to Java and Sumatra in the Netherlands East Indies. The two ships then moved from their anchorage to assist HMAS Yarra and other convoy escorts in the rescue of survivors of the troop ship RMS Empress of Asia.

On 6 February, with Japanese advances on the city itself in progress, the ships began operations toward Abang Island (Note: A minor island in the Riau Archipelago located southwest of Galang Island.) with particular orders to ensure destruction of radar sets and electronic equipment aboard the bombed and stranded ship Loch Ranza. Bendigo left Singapore at 21:20 to act as lightship for an outgoing convoy followed by Wollongong, the last Australian warship to leave the city, at midnight. After finding Loch Ranza burned out and sunk the ships made their way along the coast of Sumatra, hiding in inlets from air search, finally joining HMAS Ballarat and HMAS Toowoomba at Palembang on the afternoon of 11 February.

=== Collapse of Java ===
On 12 February the situation at Palembang was alarming enough that the officer in command of the minesweepers, including the small minesweepers HMS Gemas and HMS Rahman that had accompanied Ballarat and Toowoomba from Singapore, ordered the ships to sea. At the request of the Dutch authorities they provided escort for a convoy of twelve ships heading for Batavia where in the Banka Strait the convoy joined a stream of vessels fleeing Singapore with the convoy itself growing to twenty-eight ships. The convoy hugged the coast and, though still attracting air attacks, were not the focus as a convoy of large tankers taking the main route was the main target.

As Sumatra fell and Java became the next invasion target Bendigo, Ballarat, Burnie and Maryborough on 22 February replaced coal burning British auxiliaries of the joint Dutch and British Sunda Strait Patrol, an effort to prevent Japanese infiltration of Java by use of small craft. By the 28th, the base they were using for the patrols was untenable, the ships were short of fuel and they were to replenish at Tjilatjap but Bendigo, along with Burnie, were ordered to fall back to pick up survivors seen signalling from the beach at Java Head. The ships that had gone ahead were ordered back to the Sunda Strait but Bendigo with fifteen and Burnie with twenty-nine survivors aboard were directed to now head for Tjilatjap. In the meantime the Battle of the Java Sea on the 27th and Battle of Sunda Strait, taking place on the night of these events, had sealed the fate of Java and the short lived American-British-Dutch-Australian Command (ABDA).

On 1 March Batavia was being evacuated with truck convoys and trains headed for Tjilatjap where all British warships were ordered to assist in evacuation. Arriving there in the afternoon Bendigo then broadcast a message from Commodore Collins, commanding British naval forces, advising that Japanese forces were to the south and ships with sufficient fuel should avoid Tjilatjap and head directly for Fremantle or across the Indian Ocean to Colombo. Bendigo with eighty-nine passengers aboard sailed for Fremantle shortly before midnight in advance of the remainder of the group which, excepting Burnie now with Collins aboard, had not yet arrived.

=== Australia and New Guinea ===
The Japanese forces south of Java were the cruisers and destroyers under Admiral Kondō. Bendigo had narrowly avoided that force which had already accounted for USS Pillsbury and not long after being sighted by Bendigo, USS Asheville. On 8 March 1942 Bendigo and Burnie both arrived at Fremantle to join other ships, including Ashville's luckier companions and the last of the United States Asiatic Fleet surface units USS Tulsa, USS Isabel and USS Lark, escaping Java and Kondō's blocking force. The remainder of the 21st Minesweeping Flotilla's corvettes arrived safely on 9 March after having been among the rearguard of Allied naval forces all the way from Singapore.

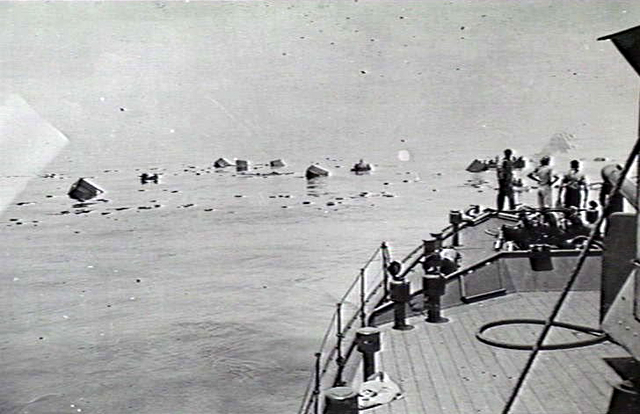
Survivors from 's Jacob clinging to wreckage about to be rescued by HMAS Bendigo, 8 March 1943.

By April 1942, with convoy escorts desperately needed, five of the Australian-built corvettes including Bendigo (Note: The others were Goulburn, Ballarat, Whyalla and Kalgoorlie.) were assigned to the ANZAC Area covering the eastern approaches to Australia, a zone that was shortly later reorganized into the new Southwest Pacific Area. Operations during this period included convoy duty during the Japanese submarine attacks on Australia's east coast. By September 1942, in the buildup at Port Moresby and Milne Bay in New Guinea escorting convoys and providing antisubmarine patrol. During Operation Lilliput, small convoys from Milne Bay to Oro Bay supporting the campaign at Buna-Gona, she was providing escort for the Dutch ship 's Jacob on 8 March 1943 when that ship came under air attack and was sunk with Bendigo rescuing the survivors. In Operation Accountant, a simultaneous effort with Lilliput to move the United States 162nd Infantry Regiment from Australia to the New Guinea front, the ship was one of four corvettes involved in the New Guinea convoy segment. Bendigo and HMAS Moresby were escorting convoy OC-86 from Melbourne to Newcastle during 11 April 1943 attack in which the cargo ship Recina was sunk that signalled resumption of submarine activity after a lull.

Bendigo was one of the sixteen Australian ships specified in the twenty-four escorts that were to be part of the British Pacific Fleet in a 26 January 1945 in a listing provided by that fleet's commander to Allied forces. By March 1945 Bendigo was operating in the Philippines as part of a task unit of that fleet and took part in the Battle of Okinawa later that month through May 1945. Following the end of the war Bendigo and the other ships of 21st Minesweeping Flotilla along with 22nd Minesweeping Flotilla operated as a minesweeper and anti-piracy patrol vessel in the Hong Kong area before returning to Australia in December 1945.

The corvette was awarded the battle honours "Pacific 1942–44", "New Guinea 1942–44", and "Okinawa 1945" for her wartime service.

== Sale—People's Liberation Army Navy ==
Bendigo, paid off on 27 September 1946, was sold to the Ta Hing Company of Hong Kong as a seagoing vessel and renamed Cheung Hing.

However, the ship was later acquired by the Chinese People's Liberation Army Navy (PLAN) and re-armed for naval service under the name Luoyang. She appears to have left PLAN service by 1988.
