= 1200-ton Oil Fuel Lighter =

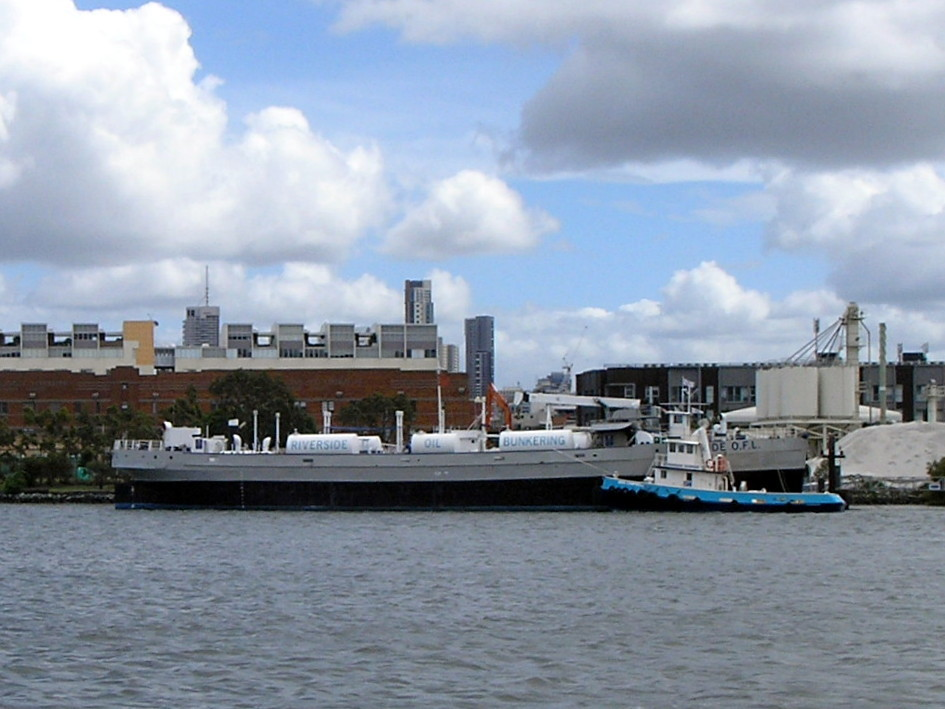
- Riverside OFL, the former OFL 1206, in 2008

Class overview
- Builders: Evans Deakin and Company (2); Mort's Dock (2); Poole & Steel (2); Williamstown Naval Dockyard (2)
- Operators: Royal Australian Navy; Riverside Marine
- Built: 1940–1946
- Completed: 8
- Retired: 8

General characteristics
- Type: Oil fuel lighter
- Displacement: 820 tonnes
- Length: 187.9 feet (57.3 m)
- Beam: 37.3 feet (11.4 m)
- Draught: 12.3 feet (3.7 m)
- Propulsion: None
- Complement: 6
- Notes: Data from

The 1200-ton Oil Fuel Lighter was a class of oil fuel lighters built for the Royal Australian Navy between 1940 and 1946.

== Design ==
The lighters were 186 feet (57 m) in length and 36 feet (11 m) beam and cost about £38,940 each to build. The vessels did not have engines. At the time the first ship of the class was ordered for the Royal Australian Navy, it was to be the largest lighter ever built in Australia. While OFL 1201 was completed in 1940, the other vessels in the class were not completed until 1945 or 1946.

The lighters were capable of carrying up to 1,204 tons of oil fuel, which was transferred to other vessels using four pumps. The lighters were also fitted with accommodation spaces and a galley on their upper deck, and carried a 15-foot (4.6 m) dinghy.

== Oil fuel lighters ==
Eight ships of the class were eventually constructed, of which two were allocated names.

- OFL 1201, Rocklea, built by Evans Deakin and Company, Brisbane
- OFL 1202, built by Mort's Dock
- OFL 1203, built by Mort's Dock
- OFL 1204, built by Poole and Steel. Based at Darwin as of 1953. Sunk for target practice in October 1985.
- OFL 1205
- OFL 1206, built at the Williamstown Naval Dockyard, was completed on 12 October 1945, and was sold into mercantile service in 1964. Operated in Brisbane as Riverside OFL until being sold in 2009 and scrapped. Funnel preserved outside Riverside Marine's headquarters.
- OFL 1207, built at the Williamstown Naval Dockyard, was completed on 15 February 1946, and was still in service in the late 1980s.
- OFL 1208, Karpoint, built by Evans Deakin and Company, Brisbane

OFLs 1201, 1202, 1203, 1204, 1207 and 1208 remained in use with the Royal Australian Navy as of 1983. By this time 1205 and 1206 had been sold.
