= HMAS Geraldton (J178) =

1941 Bathurst-class corvette

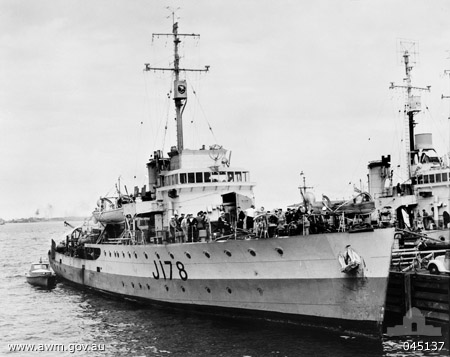
- HMAS Geraldton

History

Australia
- Namesake: City of Geraldton, Western Australia
- Builder: Poole & Steel
- Laid down: 20 November 1940
- Launched: 16 August 1941
- Commissioned: 6 April 1942
- Decommissioned: 14 June 1946
- Honours and awards: Battle honours: Pacific 1942; Indian Ocean 1942–45; Sicily 1943

Turkey
- Name: Antalya
- Acquired: 14 June 1946
- Commissioned: 24 August 1946
- Decommissioned: 1975
- Renamed: TCG Ayvalik (1963)
- Fate: Removed from service

General characteristics
- Class & type: Bathurst-class corvette
- Displacement: 650 tons (standard), 1,025 tons (full war load)
- Length: 186 ft (57 m)
- Beam: 31 ft (9.4 m)
- Draught: 8.5 ft (2.6 m)
- Propulsion: triple expansion engine, 2 shafts, 2,000 hp
- Speed: 15 knots (28 km/h; 17 mph) at 1,750 hp
- Complement: 85
- Armament: 1 × 12-pounder gun (replaced by 1 × 4 inch Mk XIX gun); 1 × Bofors 40 mm L/60 gun (installed later); 3 × 20 mm Oerlikons (later 6, then 4); Machine guns; Depth charge chutes and throwers

HMAS Geraldton (J178/B242/A116), named for the city of Geraldton, Western Australia, was one of 60 Bathurst-class corvettes constructed during World War II and one of 20 built for the Admiralty but manned by personnel of and commissioned into the Royal Australian Navy (RAN).

== Design and construction ==
In 1938, the Australian Commonwealth Naval Board (ACNB) identified the need for a general purpose 'local defence vessel' capable of both anti-submarine and mine-warfare duties, while easy to construct and operate. The vessel was initially envisaged as having a displacement of approximately 500 tons, a speed of at least 10 knots (19 km/h; 12 mph), and a range of 2,000 nautical miles (3,700 km; 2,300 mi) The opportunity to build a prototype in the place of a cancelled Bar-class boom defence vessel saw the proposed design increased to a 680-ton vessel, with a 15.5 knots (28.7 km/h; 17.8 mph) top speed, and a range of 2,850 nautical miles (5,280 km; 3,280 mi), armed with a 4-inch gun, equipped with asdic, and able to fitted with either depth charges or minesweeping equipment depending on the planned operations: although closer in size to a sloop than a local defence vessel, the resulting increased capabilities were accepted due to advantages over British-designed mine warfare and anti-submarine vessels. Construction of the prototype HMAS Kangaroo did not go ahead, but the plans were retained. The need for locally built 'all-rounder' vessels at the start of World War II saw the "Australian Minesweepers" (designated as such to hide their anti-submarine capability, but popularly referred to as "corvettes") approved in September 1939, with 60 constructed during the course of the war: 36 ordered by the RAN, 20 (including Geraldton) ordered by the British Admiralty but manned and commissioned as RAN vessels, and 4 for the Royal Indian Navy.

Geraldton was laid down by Poole & Steel at Balmain, New South Wales on 20 November 1940. She was launched on 16 August 1941 by the wife of William McKell, then Premier of New South Wales, and was commissioned into the RAN on 6 April 1942.

== Operational history ==
=== RAN service ===
After entering active service, Geraldton spent a brief period acting as an anti-submarine patrol ship off the east coast of Australia, before being assigned to the British Eastern Fleet in July 1942. Arriving in Colombo during August, Geraldton was the third Bathurst class corvette to join the Eastern Fleet. From August 1942 to April 1943, Geraldton escorted convoys between Colombo and the Persian Gulf.

In May 1943, Gerldton was assigned to the 22nd Minesweeping Flotilla and deployed to the Mediterranean. During this deployment, she served as a convoy escort, was involved in the Allied invasion of Sicily during July, and entered the Atlantic Ocean in August to meet a Mediterranean-bound convoy. The corvette returned to cross-Indian convoy duties in October, and continued this duty until she was assigned to the British Pacific Fleet in January 1945 and returned to Australian waters. Before joining the Pacific Fleet, Geraldton underwent an armament reconfiguration in Melbourne during February, then a general two-month refit in Fremantle from March until May.

After refits, Geraldton was assigned to the east coast of Australia for four months, before moving north and serving as an escort for the Pacific Fleet's Fleet Train until the end of World War II. After the end of the war, the corvette was deployed to Hong Kong, where she was present for the surrender ceremony on 16 September. While in Hong Kong, Geraldton supported the recovery and transfer of prisoners-of-war and performed anti-piracy duties. The corvette returned to Australia at the end of 1945, and spent the first part of 1946 operating from Fremantle, before the corvette was ordered to Colombo.

The corvette's wartime service was recognised with three battle honours: "Pacific 1942", "Indian Ocean 1942–45", and "Sicily 1943".

=== Turkish Navy service ===
After the end of World War II, Geraldton was marked for transfer to the Turkish Navy. After arriving in Colombo in late May, Geraldton was decommissioned on 14 June 1946. She was commissioned into the Turkish Navy as TCG Antalya on 24 August 1946.

Following the decommissioning of sister ship TCG Ayvalik (formerly HMAS Gawler), Antalya was renamed Ayvalik. The corvette left service in 1975.
