= HMAS Junee =

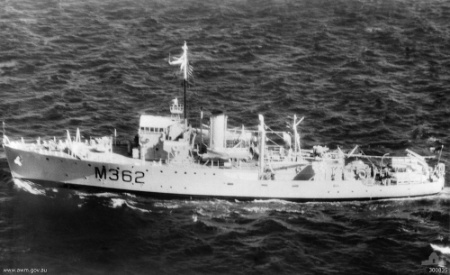
- HMAS Junee as a training ship in 1954. Her wartime armament has been replaced with two 40 mm Bofors guns.

History

Australia
- Namesake: Town of Junee, New South Wales
- Builder: Poole & Steel
- Laid down: 17 February 1943
- Launched: 16 November 1943
- Commissioned: 11 April 1944
- Decommissioned: 21 January 1946
- Recommissioned: 25 February 1953
- Decommissioned: 21 August 1957
- Reclassified: Training ship (1953)
- Honours and awards: Battle honours: New Guinea 1943; Pacific 1944–45
- Fate: Sold for scrap in 1958
- Badge

General characteristics
- Class & type: Bathurst-class corvette
- Displacement: 650 tons (standard), 1,025 tons (full war load)
- Length: 186 ft (57 m)
- Beam: 31 ft (9.4 m)
- Draught: 8.5 ft (2.6 m)
- Propulsion: triple expansion engine, 2 shafts, 1,800 horspeower
- Speed: 15 knots (28 km/h; 17 mph) at 1,750 hp
- Complement: 85
- Armament: 1 × 4-inch gun 1 × 40 mm anti-aircraft gun

HMAS Junee (J362/M362), named for the town of Junee, New South Wales, was one of 60 Bathurst-class corvettes constructed during World War II, and one of 36 initially manned and commissioned solely by the Royal Australian Navy (RAN).

== Design and construction ==
In 1938, the Australian Commonwealth Naval Board (ACNB) identified the need for a general purpose 'local defence vessel' capable of both anti-submarine and mine-warfare duties, while easy to construct and operate. The vessel was initially envisaged as having a displacement of approximately 500 tons, a speed of at least 10 knots (19 km/h; 12 mph), and a range of 2,000 nautical miles (3,700 km; 2,300 mi) The opportunity to build a prototype in the place of a cancelled Bar-class boom defence vessel saw the proposed design increased to a 680-ton vessel, with a 15.5 knots (28.7 km/h; 17.8 mph) top speed, and a range of 2,850 nautical miles (5,280 km; 3,280 mi), armed with a 4-inch gun, equipped with asdic, and able to fitted with either depth charges or minesweeping equipment depending on the planned operations: although closer in size to a sloop than a local defence vessel, the resulting increased capabilities were accepted due to advantages over British-designed mine warfare and anti-submarine vessels. Construction of the prototype HMAS Kangaroo did not go ahead, but the plans were retained. The need for locally built 'all-rounder' vessels at the start of World War II saw the "Australian Minesweepers" (designated as such to hide their anti-submarine capability, but popularly referred to as "corvettes") approved in September 1939, with 60 constructed during the course of the war: 36 (including Junee) ordered by the RAN, 20 ordered by the British Admiralty but manned and commissioned as RAN vessels, and 4 for the Royal Indian Navy.

Junee was laid down by Poole & Steel at Balmain, New South Wales on 17 February 1943. She was launched on 16 November 1943 by the wife of John Solomon Rosevear, Speaker of the Australian House of Representatives, and commissioned into the RAN on 11 April 1944.

== Operational history ==
=== World War II ===
After entering active service, Junee was briefly assigned to New Guinea before being redeployed to Darwin, where she served as an anti-submarine patrol ship until February 1945, when the corvette underwent refit in Melbourne.

In April 1945, Junee was sent to New Guinea, to serve as a convoy escort and anti-submarine patrol ship. In August, the corvette fired her weapons in anger for the first time; sinking three Japanese supply barges while in the Sangir Islands. The corvette was later assigned to Balikpapan as a guard ship, where she remained until the end of World War II.

Following the end of the war, Junee evacuated Australian prisoners-of-war and civilians, assisted in the transportation of occupation forces, and aided in the reestablishment of Dutch authority in the Netherlands East Indies. After fulfilling these duties, Junee returned to Australia, and was paid off into reserve in Melbourne on 21 January 1946.

Junee received two battle honours for her wartime service: "New Guinea 1943" and "Pacific 1944–45".

=== Post-war ===
The corvette was reactivated and recommissioned as a training ship on 25 February 1953. Initially operating along the east coast, Junee was reassigned to the west coast on 25 August, operating from Fremantle.

== Decommissioning and fate ==
HMAS Junee paid off to reserve for the final time at Fremantle on 21 August 1957. She was sold for scrap to W. G. Davies of Fremantle on 18 June 1958. The ship was stripped and the hull sunk in the Rottnest ship graveyard off Rottnest Island, Western Australia on 6 or 7 September 1968.
