= Evans Deakin and Company =

Australian engineering company and shipbuilder

Evans Deakin & Company
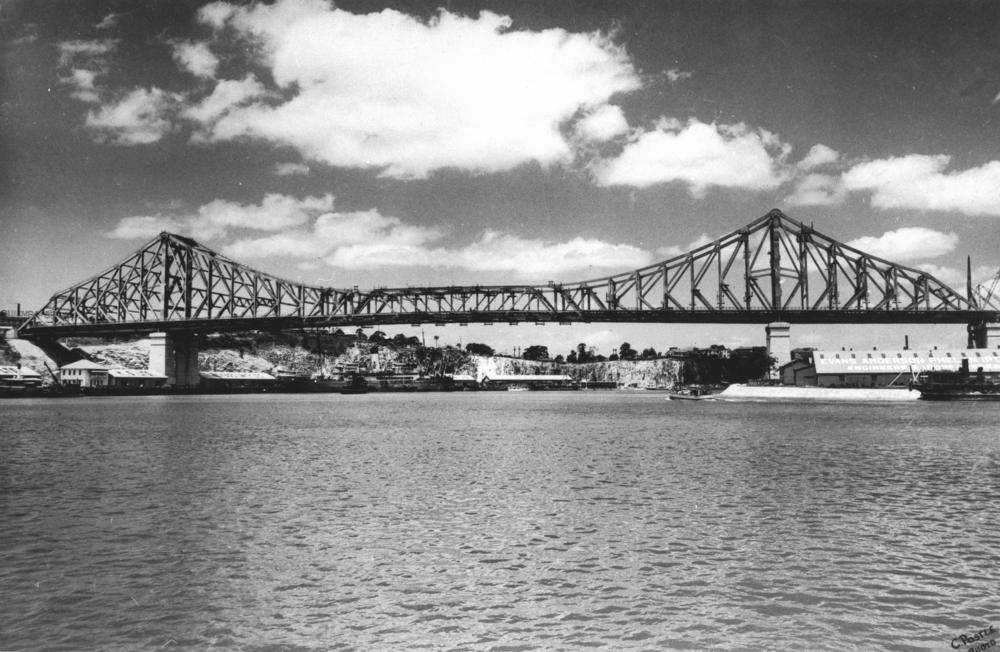
- Brisbane's Story Bridge in 1940, this 281 metre cantilever truss bridge was constructed by Evans Deakin - Hornibrook Pty Ltd
- Traded as: ASX: EDI
- Industry: Engineering
- Founded: 1910
- Founder: Daniel Evans; Arthur Deakin
- Defunct: March 2001
- Successor: Downer EDI
- Headquarters: Brisbane
- Subsidiaries: Walkers Limited

Evans Deakin & Company was an Australian engineering company and shipbuilder. In 2019, the company was inducted into the Queensland Business Leaders Hall of Fame in recognition of its major contributions to the Queensland economy for nearly a century through excellence in heavy engineering, construction and ship building.

== History ==
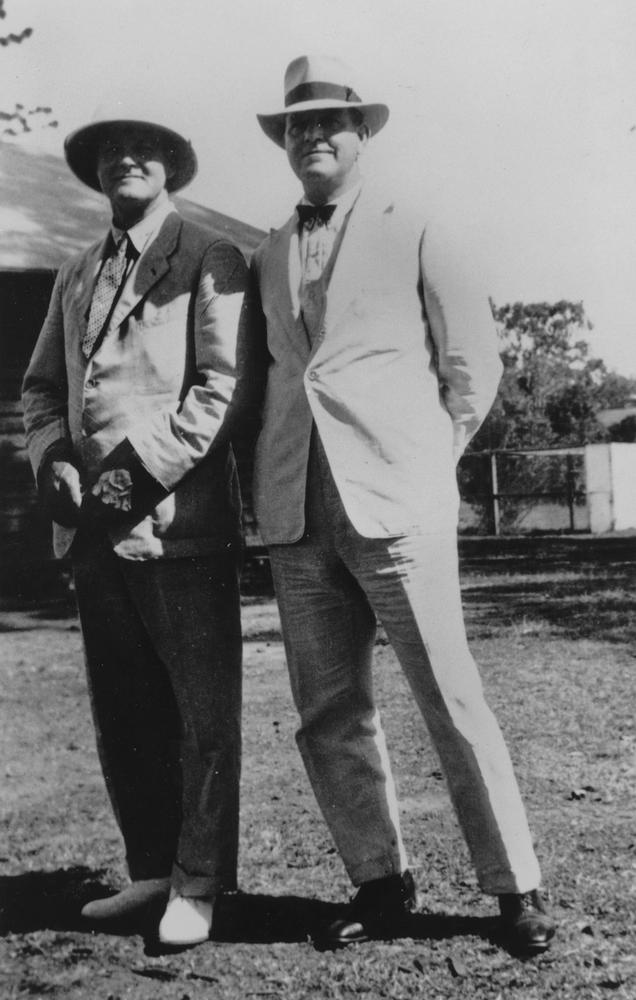
Daniel Evans and Arthur Deakin at an EDCO (Evans Deakin and Company) picnic at Lone Pine, 1930

Based in Brisbane, the company was formed in 1910 by Daniel Edward Evans and Arthur Joseph Deakin. The company started out as a supplier of engineering equipment. The first workshop was acquired in 1913.

The company later became Evans Deakin Industries (EDI). In 1980 EDI purchased Maryborough rolling stock manufacturer Walkers Limited. In July 1996 EDI purchased locomotive manufacturer Clyde Engineering.

In March 2001 EDI was acquired by Downer & Company, with the resulting merger being renamed Downer EDI.

Between World War I and World War II, Evans Deakin was involved in the fabrication of 300 railway wagons for Queensland Government Railways, the manufacture of steel components for the Story Bridge, and the introduction of oxy-acetylene and electric arc welding to Queensland.

== Kangaroo Point shipyard ==
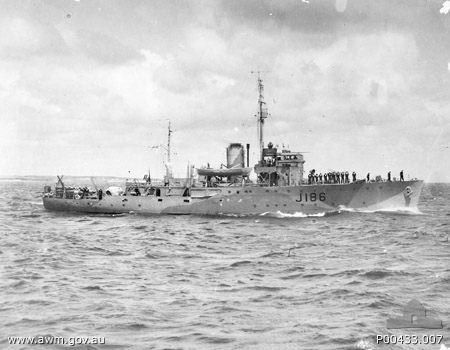
HMAS Ipswich in 1944, built at the Evans Deakin shipyards in 1941

At the start of World War II, the company established a shipyard at Kangaroo Point on the Brisbane River taking over the Queensland Government's lease of Moar's Slipway beside Cairns Street (27.4727°S 153.0379°E) (which was then owned by the Brisbane City Council). The company developed the site for the construction of military and merchant vessels. In January 1940 the first ship to be built at the Evans Deakin shipyard was announced. The ship was the first 1200-ton oil fuel lighter for the Royal Australian Navy, which was then using 500-ton oil fuel lighters. Named the Rocklea, it cost £38,947 and pumps to enable the rapid re-fuelling of warships.

A major expansion at the Kangaroo Point site when the Frank Nicklin Dry Dock was constructed costing A$3.4 million of which A$1.5 million was contributed by the Queensland Government. The dock was 800 feet (240 m) long, 115 feet (35 m) wide and 21 feet (6.4 m) deep and could handle vessels up to 60,000 tons. The dock was officially opened in July 1967 by Queensland Premier Frank Nicklin after whom the dock was named. In his speech, Nicklin said it was important that Australian developed greater shipbuilding capabilities as Australia had been isolated from large shipbuilding countries during the two world wars, which was compounded by Britain's withdrawal from the Far East. Nicklin then pressed a button allowing the water from the Brisbane River to flow into the dock.

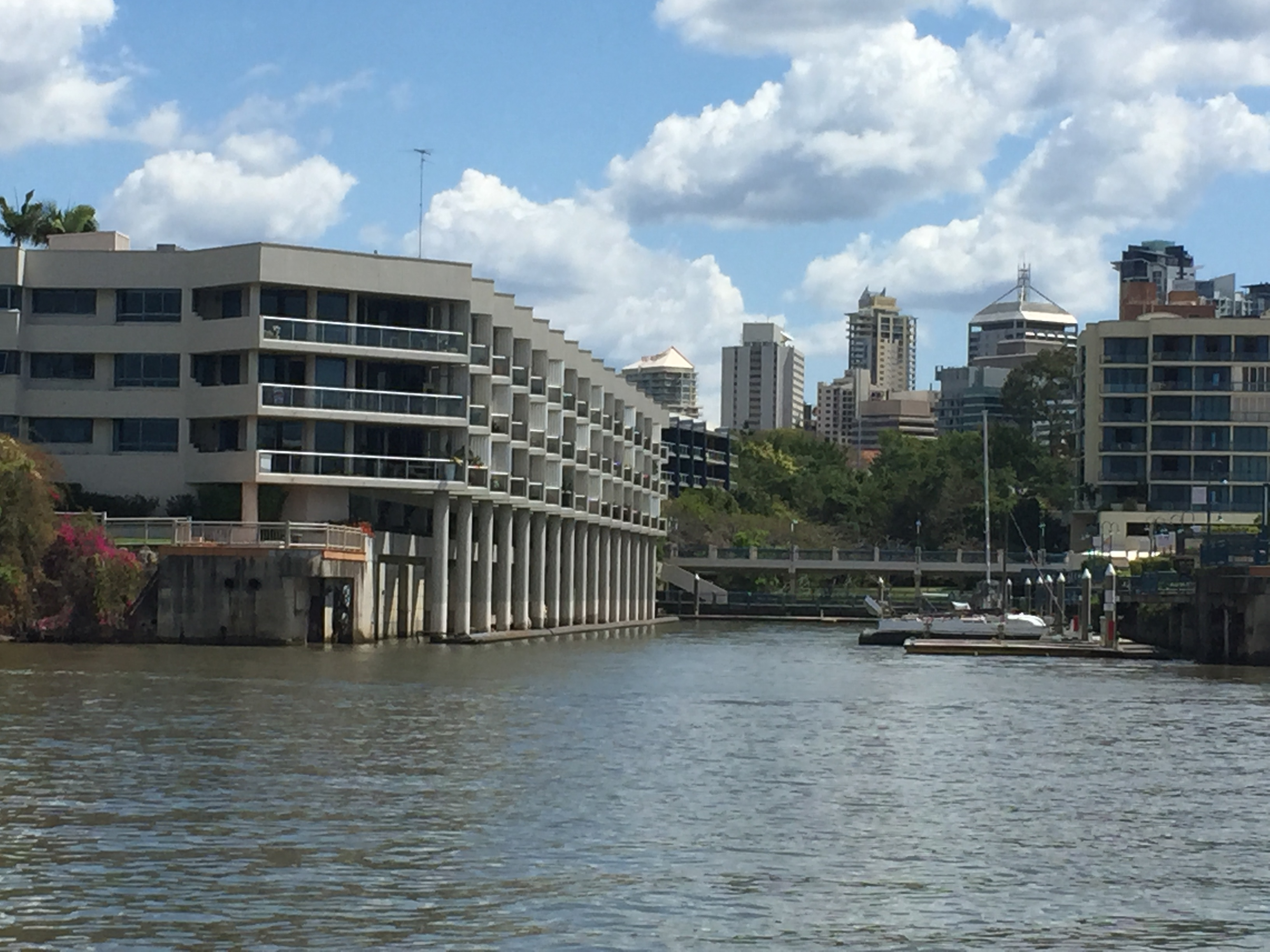
Apartments and marina, Dockside, Kangaroo Point, 2014

The company built the largest ship ever made on the Brisbane River, the oil tanker Robert Miller. Its construction was nearly complete when it broke free of its mooring during the 1974 Brisbane flood. The final vessel constructed at Kangaroo Point was the oil rig, Southern Cross in 1976.

The Evans Deakin shipyard constructed 81 ships between 1940 and its closure in 1976, including eleven Bathurst-class corvettes, a Bay-class frigate, several Attack-class patrol boats and four A-class cargo steamships. They also built trawlers, bulk carriers, tankers and tugs.

After being left vacant for a number of years, in 1988 the shipyard was redeveloped as a hotel and apartment complex called Dockside. One of the dry docks was retained as a marina. There is a monument to the Evans Deakin shipyards in Captain Burke Park (at the eastern end of Holman Street) on the tip of Kangaroo Point (27.4657°S 153.0367°E); this is further north than the original site of the shipyards.
