= Woolwich Dock =

Coordinates: 33.8408°S 151.1723°E

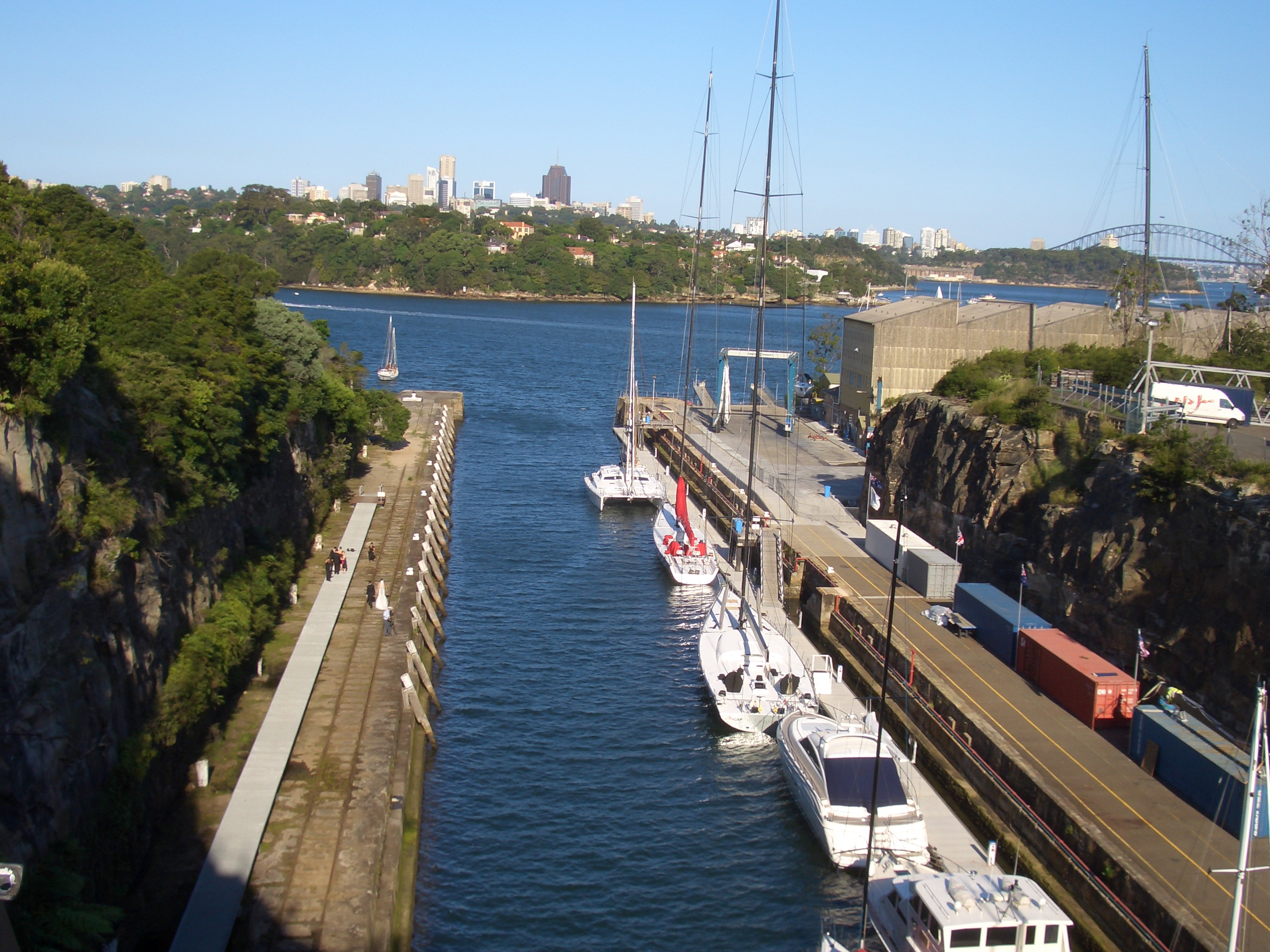
Woolwich Dock, Sydney

Woolwich Dock is a former dry dock and shipyard in Woolwich, Sydney, New South Wales, Australia. The site was purchased by Morts Dock and Engineering Company in 1898. When it was officially opened on 4 December 1901 it was the biggest dry dock in Australia, at 188 metres (617 ft) long and 27 metres (89 ft) wide.

== History ==
Several extensions were carried out between 1902 and 1918, and the dock was lengthened to 260 metres. To achieve this William Street was acquired and a new road constructed – Franki Avenue, named after the general manager and later managing director of the company, James Peter Franki.

By 1917 the company employed over 1,500 people.

In the 1940s the Atlas workshops were replaced by the sawtooth roofed building which still stands on the site and several brick buildings were added. The busiest times for Woolwich Dock were during the two world wars when many passenger vessels were converted to armed troopships and repairs were carried out on damaged ships.

After the Second World War work declined and the dock was closed down in 1958 and until 1963 the dock was vacant.

=== Woolwich Redevelopment Scheme (1960) ===
In 1960 there was a scheme for a modernist redevelopment of the dock. There were 2000 apartments planned, to house 5000 people. Around 20 high-rise towers would have been built.

=== 1963–1997: Army Occupation ===
The Australian Army purchased it in 1963 for its water transport operations. The three oldest buildings on the site were demolished and the Army erected a number of metal prefabricated buildings, added timber fender piers and timber wharves to the dock itself and constructed a traveling boat crane beside the dock.

They made use of the dock for launching craft and the workshops for repairs and maintenance.

The Army units based at Woolwich were relocated to Townsville, Queensland, in 1997.

=== 1997 Onwards ===
In the late 1990s it was proposed that the land be sold to developers. A community group, Foreshore 2000 Woolwich, was formed to protest against sale of the site and through the lobbying efforts of this group and the local council, the Australian Government agreed to the site being returned to the people of Sydney. In 2001 the Sydney Harbour Federation Trust was formed to administer Woolwich Dock and various other sites around Sydney Harbour.

== Ferns ==
The sandstone cliffs near the head of the dock area have a notable population of ferns. Coral ferns (Gleichenia species) and king fern are prominent. Three locally uncommon species have been recorded on the sandstone cliffs beside the walking path; fork fern (Tmesipteris truncata), scrambling clubmoss (Lycopodium cernuum) and the skeleton fork fern (Psilotum nudum).

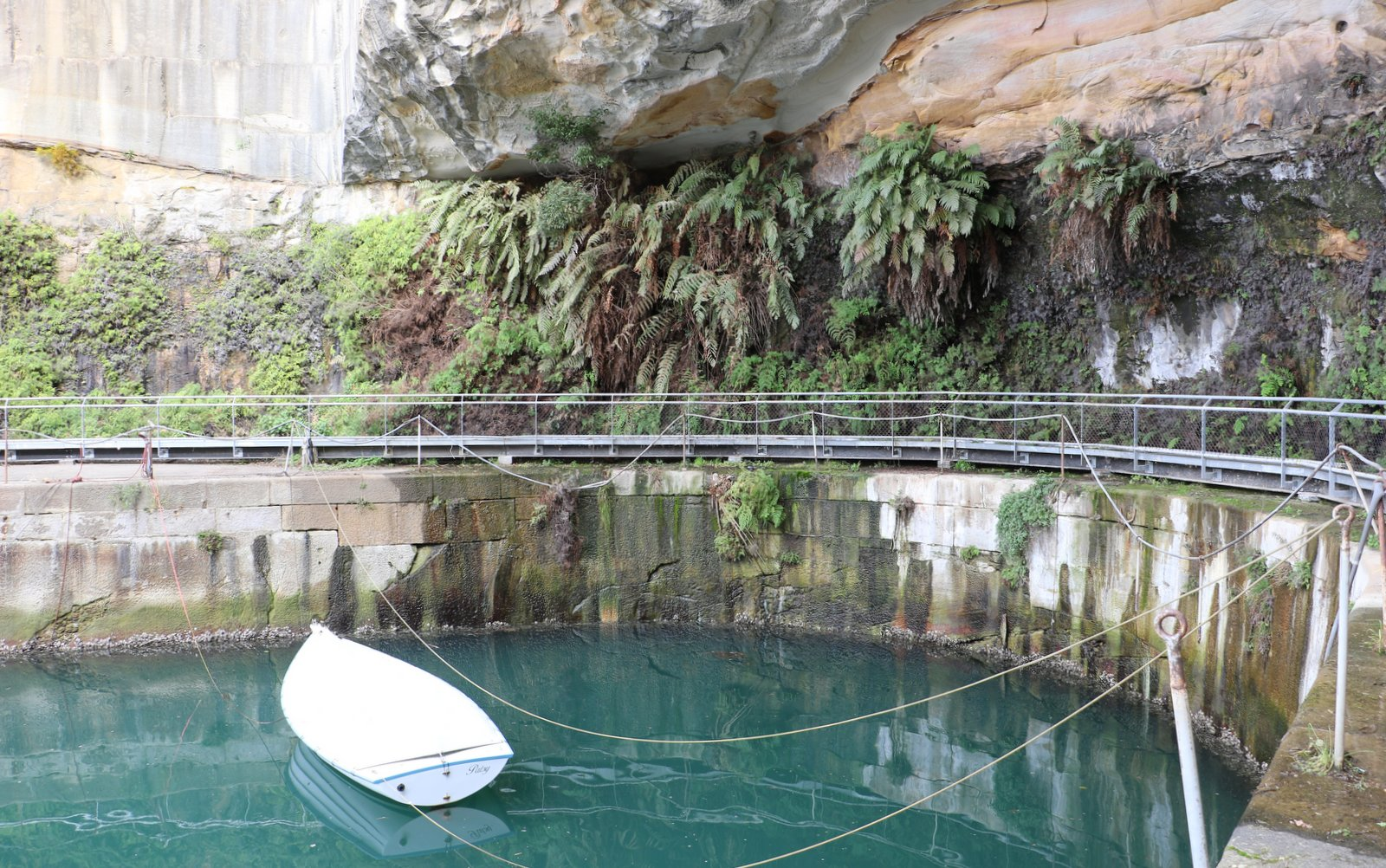
fern growth at Woolwich Dock
