= 500-ton Oil Fuel Lighter =

Class overview
- Builders: Mort's Dock, Balmain, New South Wales; Poole & Steel, Balmain, New South Wales
- Operators: Royal Australian Navy
- Built: 1913–1916
- Completed: 4
- Lost: 1
- Retired: 3

General characteristics
- Type: Oil Fuel Lighter
- Length: 156 ft (48 m)
- Beam: 30 ft (9.1 m)
- Depth: 14 ft (4.3 m)
- Capacity: 550 tons

The 500-ton Oil Fuel Lighter was a class of oil fuel lighters built for the Royal Australian Navy between 1913 and 1916.

== Design ==
The lighters were 156 feet (48 m) in length, 14 feet (4.3 m) depth and 30 feet (9.1 m) breadth and cost about £18,000 each to build. The hull included 10 oil tanks, separated by air spaces and cofferdams, which held a capacity of 550 tons of liquid fuel oil. Sleeping accommodation and a saloon were also provided in the forward portion. Two sets of diesel engines with centrifugal pumps discharged the fuel oil from the tanks.

== Oil fuel lighters ==
- OFL No. 1, built by Mort's Dock under contract to Cockatoo Island Dockyard, laid down in 1913 and completed in 1916. Caught fire at Stokes Hill Wharf, Darwin during the bombing of Darwin in February 1942.
- OFL No. 2, built by Mort's Dock under contract to Cockatoo Island Dockyard, laid down in 1913 and completed in 1916.
- OFL No. 3, built by Poole and Steel under contract to Cockatoo Island Dockyard, laid down in 1914 and completed in 1915.
- OFL No. 4, built by Poole and Steel under contract to Cockatoo Island Dockyard, laid down in 1914 and completed in 1915.
