= Mort's Dock =

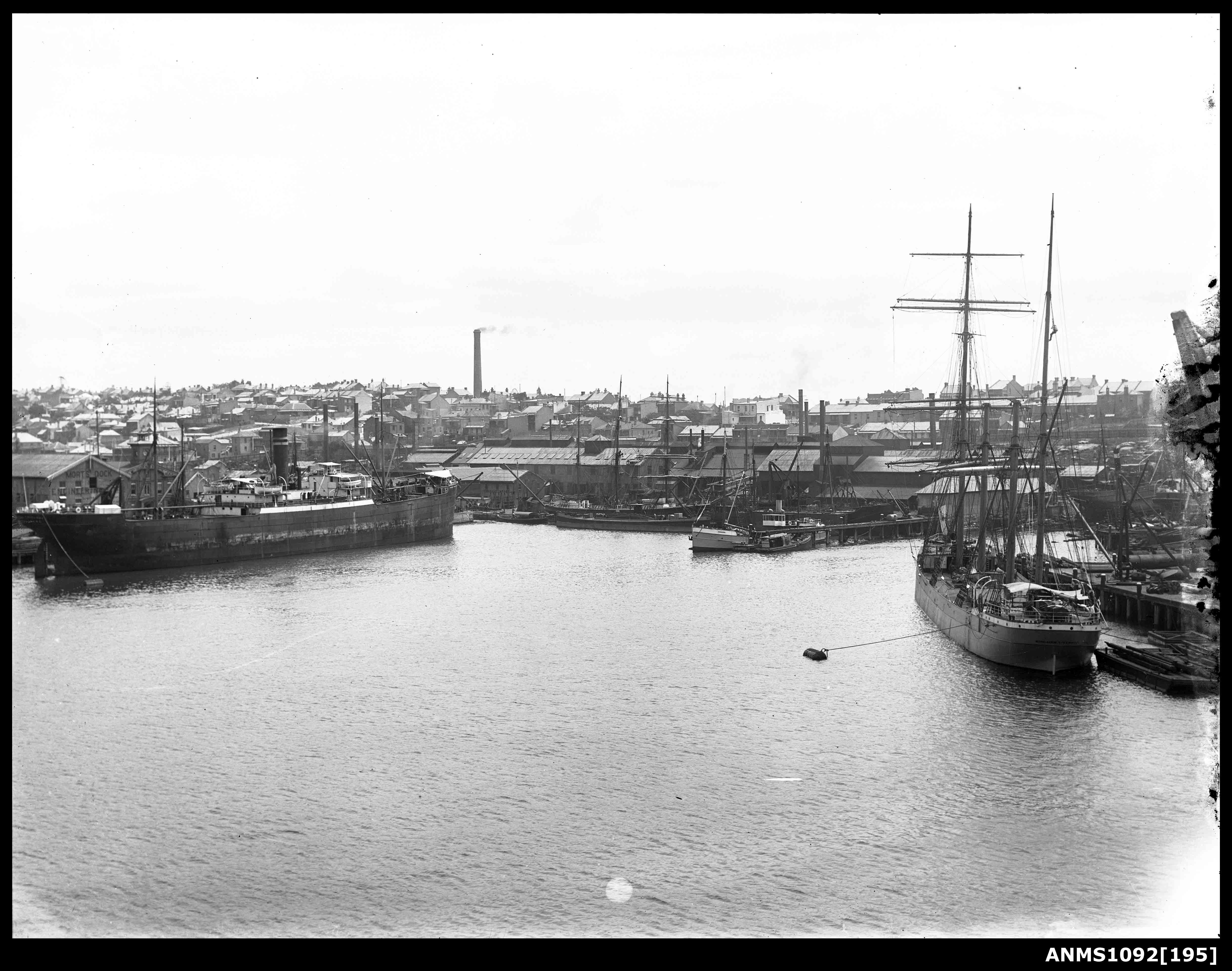
- Vessels at Mort's Dock, Sydney Harbour, 1908

- Location within New South Wales Location within Australia
- 33.8536°S 151.1843°E
- Location: Thames, Mort, College, McKell, Cameron, Yeend Streets, Balmain, New South Wales, Australia

History
- Built: 1853–1867

Site notes
- Architect: Thomas Sutcliffe Mort (originally)

New South Wales Heritage Register
- Official name: Mort's Dock; Mort's Dock & Engineering Company; Mort Bay Park
- Type: state heritage (archaeological-maritime)
- Designated: 14 January 2011
- Reference no.: 1854
- Type: Boat Building
- Category: Maritime Industry
- Builders: Private labour

Mort's Dock is a former dry dock, slipway, and shipyard in Balmain, New South Wales, Australia. It was the first dry dock in Australia, opening for business in 1855 and closing more than a century later in 1959. The site is now parkland.

== History ==
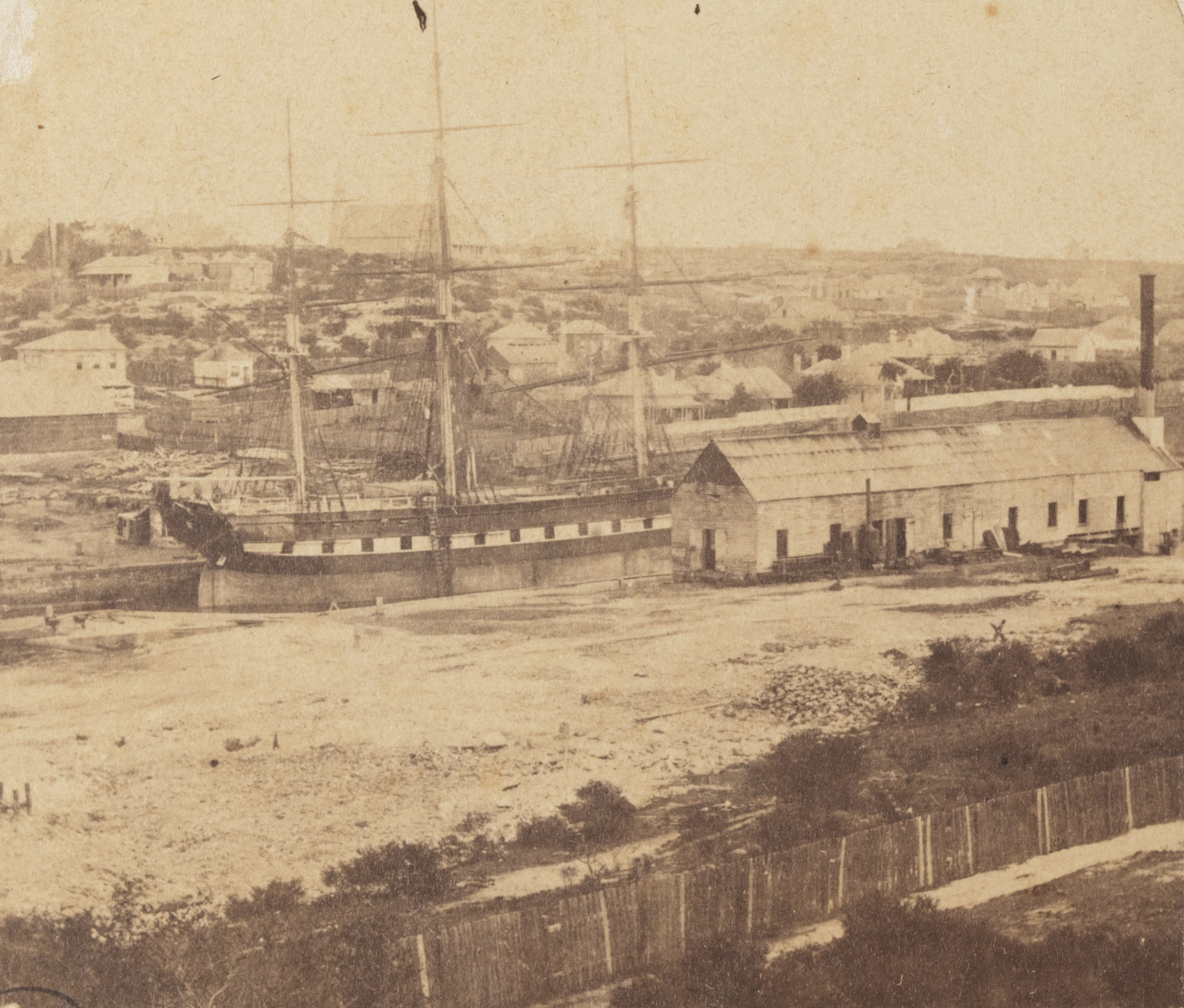
Mort’s Dock at Waterview Bay, Balmain, c. 1860, by William Hetzer

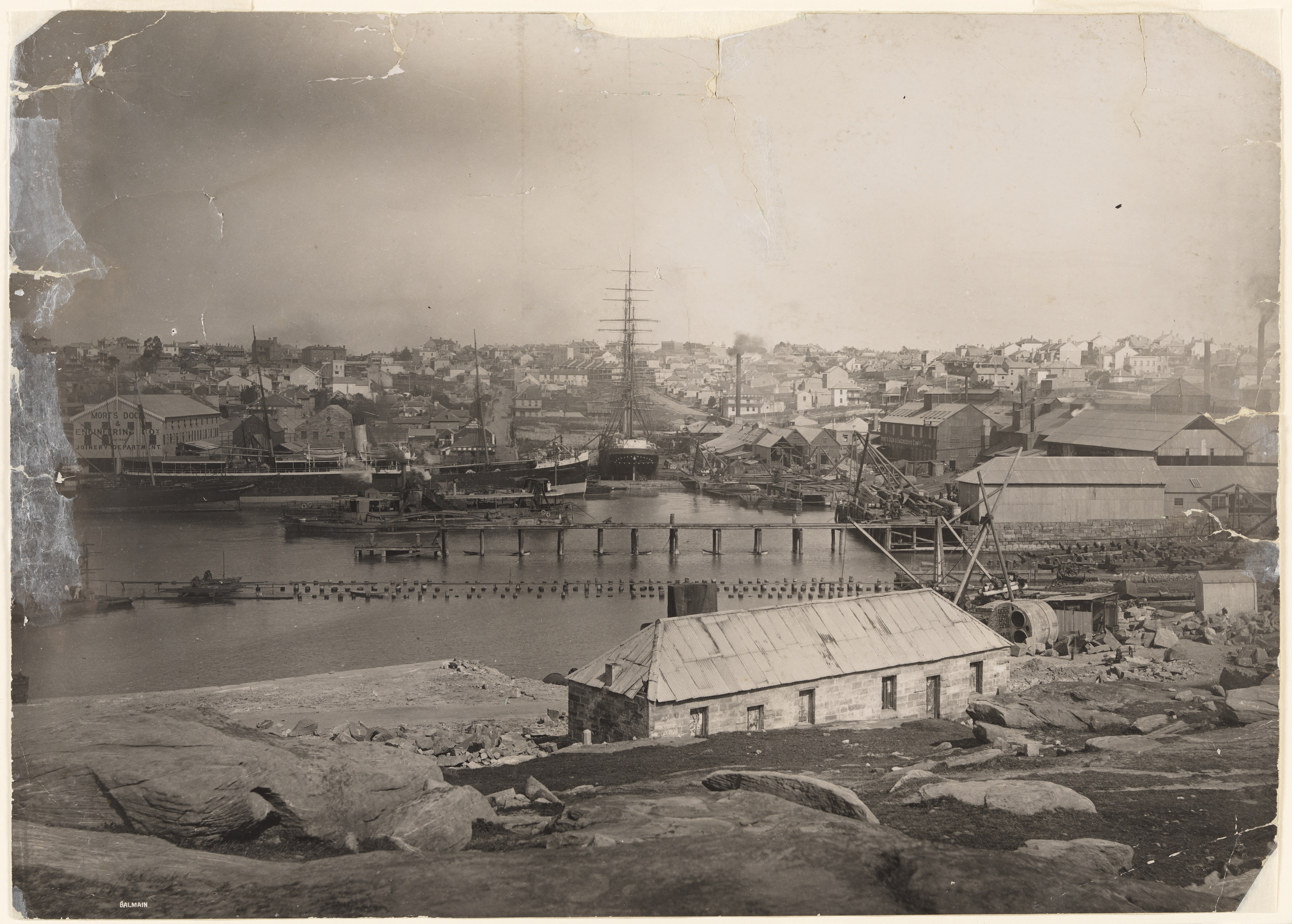
Mort’s Dock at Waterview Bay, Balmain, 1887

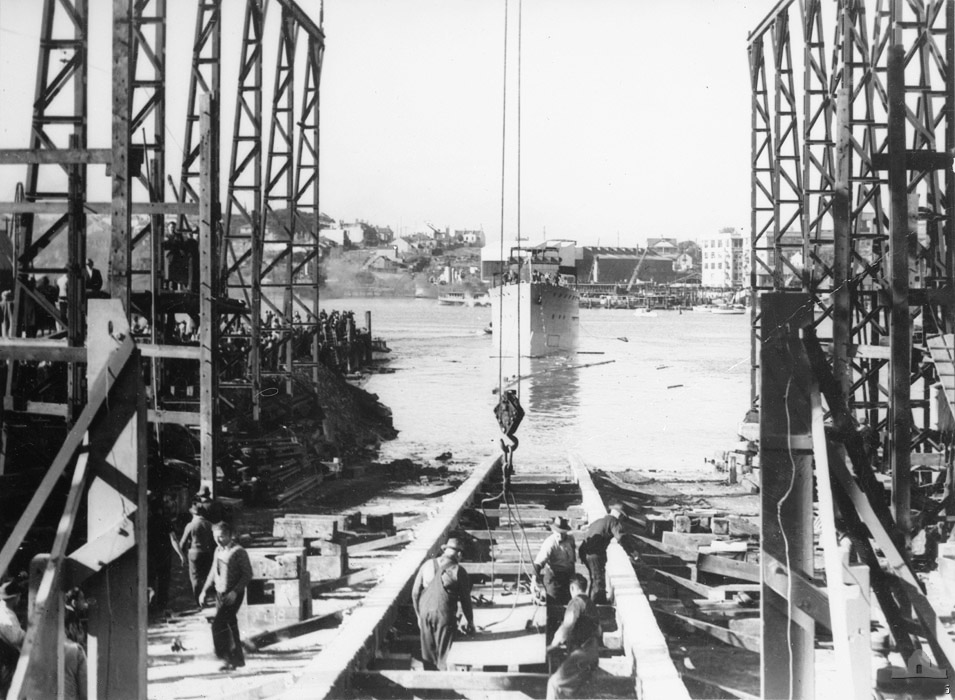
Workers at Mort's Dock lay the keel plate for a new vessel shortly after HMAS Deloraine was launched in 1941.

=== Mort Bay, J. S. Mort and his partners ===
Mort Bay was originally known as Waterview Bay, and at the corner of the bay was the mouth of a small stream which ran down from Balmain Hill through the valley of Strathean. On its way to the harbour, the stream collected in small waterholes known as the "Curtis Waterholes" after the then landowner James Curtis.

In 1842 James Reynolds purchased from Curtis an area of land bounded by what is now Curtis Road down to the water front between Mort and Church Streets, dammed the stream, built a stone house called "Strathean Cottage" and sold fresh water to the ships anchored in the deep calm waters of the bay.

The land was then sold to Captain Thomas Rowntree in 1853, who recognised the site as a prime location for a patent slip. To finance his venture, Rowntree sold his ship the "Lizzie Webber" and in doing so, met auctioneer Thomas Sutcliffe Mort. With partner merchant J.S.Mitchell, Rowntree had formed the Waterview Bay Dry Dock Company. Rowntree had arrived in NSW in 1852, owning much land. He'd built the "Lizzie Webber" to carry English passengers to the goldfields and for Australian coastal trading. Mort further recognised the necessity for Sydney to provide docking facilities for ships needing repairs in the Colony, as at that time there were no such facilities south of Bombay, India. The location was ideal.

Proprietor and landlord Thomas Sutcliffe Mort had a flair for money-making. Building a dry-dock here, he created a building boom and large-scale development. Born in Bolton, Lancashire, and comfortably raised, he'd arrived in Sydney in 1838, working as a clerk and rising rapidly. By late 1843 Mort was organising wool auctions (the first to be held solely for wool), later of livestock and property. Organising wool sales in London, he was one of our first exporters and laid a pattern for future wool brokers. Mort's Wool Store at Circular Quay was designed by Edmund Blacket, on the site of today's Quay Quarter Tower. By 1850 Mort was Sydney's leading auctioneer with a fortune from land speculation in search of port space for his wool vessels.

=== Sydney's first dry dock ===
Mort's Dock was the brainchild of industrialist Mort and former steamship captain T. S. Rountree (or Rowntree). Steam ships had first appeared in Sydney Harbour in 1853 but no repair or maintenance facilities existed to cater for the new vessels. In 1854, Mort and Rountree purchased an area of land at Waterview Bay on the northern side of the Balmain peninsula and excavated a dry dock measuring 123 by 15 metres (404 by 49 ft).

Rowntree and Mort formed the Waterview Bay Dry Dock Company (later Mort's Dock & Engineering Company) in 1853 and built Australia's first dry dock and patent slip on the site. Recognising the need, and despite the Government building a dry dock at Cockatoo Island, he started. He offered incentives: on completion, workers got a freehold block of land. The dock was operational by March 1855, one year before the Fitzroy Dock at Cockatoo Island Dockyard. Subdivisions and sales of Waterview Bay land followed the development, values spiraling when it opened. The first vessel serviced at the new Mort's Dock was the SS Hunter, a coastal mail steamer running between Sydney and Newcastle.

Mort had bought large tracts and as needs arose, sold. When the dock needed extensions (1866 and 1875), he met costs with more sales. By 1877 80% of the estate was settled by a working class population. The elite who had settled the area from the 1840s objected to pollution and industrial impediments to "their" marine views.

=== Growth of general engineering ===
Despite being the only commercial repair facility for steamers, the dock was not as profitable as expected and by 1861 Mort and Rountree had leased the majority of the surrounding land for cargo storage, minor engineering and an iron and brass foundry. In 1867, Mort's Dock became principally an engineering facility; including the construction of steam locomotives, ship machinery, mining equipment and steel pipe for the Sydney Water Board. Mort had ceased partnership with Rowntree and taken another partner in Thomas McArthur, superintendent engineer of the Australian Steam Navigation Co. When McArthur died, Mort sold his shares to his foreman and his manager, possibly to guard against growing unionism, or improve flagging productivity. Balmain had become a focus for activity because of the dock, where at least two unions were busy. Dock manager James Peter Franki continued to manage the dock for 50 years finally retiring in 1922. Ship construction and repairs continued at the dry dock and immediate surrounds.

The company become the largest private employer in the colony, a cornerstone of the union movement and birthplace of the Australian Labor Party (then the Labor Electoral League), founded at this dock in 1891 by Balmain Unionists, who fielded 4 candidates in State elections. Having bought a copper mine in Queensland and a coal mine in Newcastle, Mort added an iron and brass foundry, boiler-making facilities and a patent slip at Balmain. In 1870 the dock assembled the first locally produced locomotive.

In 1901 the company opened a second dry dock (Woolwich Dock) and slipway to cater for increased demand and by 1917 the Dock had built 39 steamships, seven Manly ferries, pumping engines for the Waverley and Crown Street reservoirs and the ironwork for the Sydney General Post Office. In the interwar period an iron foundry was constructed, a slipway and floating dock purchased and it had a virtual monopoly on local industry.

=== Naval contracts and modern era ===
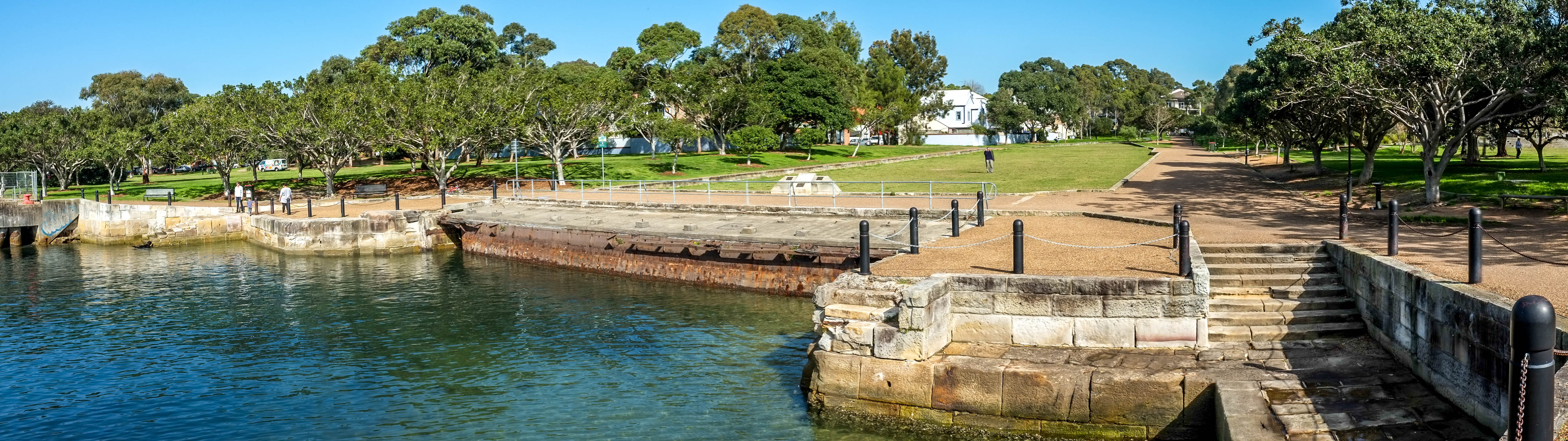
Mort Bay Park Balmain, site of Morts Dock & Engineering Company

The outbreak of World War II proved to be a boom time for Mort's Dock. The 1920s and 1930s had seen a decline in the Royal Australian Navy with few vessels constructed and older ships sold off or scrapped. Japan's entry into the war led to a sudden demand for coastal protection and increased offensive power in the Pacific Ocean. Between 1940 and 1945, Mort's Dock constructed fourteen of the sixty Bathurst-class corvettes built in Australia during the war, as well as four of the twelve River-class frigates. By the end of the war Mort's Dock was second only to the Cockatoo Island Dockyard in the number of naval vessels produced.

Shipbuilding once again declined in the post-war period, and revenue from engineering leases fell as firms relocated to cheaper land in western Sydney. The dock's death knell was the introduction of container shipping in the 1960s. Mort's Dock closed in 1958, Mort's Dock & Engineering Company went into liquidation in 1959 and ceased trading completely in 1968. The site was purchased by Australian National Line (ANL) in 1960. The derelict Mort's Dock site was levelled and converted into a container storage terminal for ships berthing at Glebe Island and White Bay in 1965; its buildings were demolished and the dock filled in for new wharves to create its newest container facility. The backfill preserved the dry dock and other in situ remains providing a high archaeological potential and fabric integrity.

Controversy raged over redeveloping the site. The NSW Government proposal for a large public housing development was vigorously opposed by resident groups who wanted it landscaped as open space. Groups such as the Balmain Association had formed in 1965, reflecting a changing mood concerning urbanisation and loss of heritage. In 1986, in what it claimed to be a compromise, the Department of Planning and the Environment announced 211 Housing Commission flats would be built, with plans for parkland and a harbour-side promenade. The park was developed in stages (one: 1985; two: 1986–9), while the container terminal closed in 1989. The remaining features of Mort's Dock were received heritage protection in the same year. The filled-in dry dock is commemorated in the name of the adjacent Dry Dock Hotel, which stands opposite the former location of the gates to the original Mort's Dock site.

=== Timeline ===
The site has been modified over time, with the major alterations as follows:

- 1853: the dry dock commenced construction;
- 1854: stone building (to be used as an office between 1877 and 1898) was constructed;
- 1855: dry dock completed; 1866 extension of the engineering and blacksmiths works to include a patternmakers shop and brass and iron foundries;
- 1870: a dam at the Cameron St end of the dry dock was constructed;
- 1874: dry dock extended to 390 feet;
- 1868: the first patent slipway was built;
- 1898: dry dock extenuated to 640 feet;
- 1959: the company went into liquidation and sold to Sims Metal;
- 1963: ANL container line bought part of the site to create a container facility. The elements retained by Sims were earmarked for a motel development which would be used in conjunction with the container terminal;
- 1966: ANL added a second berth;
- 1967: Sims demolished buildings on the northern side of dry dock with disregard for items of historical interest;
- 1968–1969: ANL filled in the dry dock, raised and levelled the site and covered with bitumen. The site was then used as a container depot until 1975 when resident protests resulted in its closure;
- 1980: NSW Cabinet proposed that ~7ha of the site be redeveloped as open space park and housing;
- 1985: development of park commenced with the demolition of the former ANL passenger terminal, associated warehouse and office buildings, concrete slab and supporting structures;
- 1986: the first stage of redevelopment was completed;
- 1986: the second stage involving the residual of the park was commenced;
- 1989: the second stage was completed with the Department of Housing to complete the residual of park construction adjacent to its site boundaries later the same year.

== Surviving remains ==
The archaeological remains of the dry dock and wider site remain buried beneath what is now Mort Bay Park. The top of the stone walls of dry dock remains visible on the ground in the park. The caisson, and stone retailing walls remain in situ as do the ships bollards, and remnants of the patent slips and later container wharf.

Both the archaeological and research potential of the site have been assessed as high. The site has a high degree of integrity and intactness as a result of the infill in the 1960s.

== Heritage listing ==
Mort's Dock was the largest shipyard and engineering workshop in Australia in the latter half of the 19th century. The site developed into the colony's largest private enterprise and in many ways helped establish the colony and Sydney as Australia's premier maritime port. The archaeological remains are possibly the only remains of a dry dock of this size preserved in situ.

Mort's Dock was listed on the New South Wales State Heritage Register on 14 January 2011 having satisfied the following criteria.

The place is important in demonstrating the course, or pattern, of cultural or natural history in New South Wales.

The site is historically significant as a key industrial site to the State, Sydney's first dry dock (1842) in continuous operation until 1979.

The place has a strong or special association with a person, or group of persons, of importance of cultural or natural history of New South Wales's history.

The site has an historical association with Thomas Rowntree, Thomas Sutcliffe Mort and latterly (as they both completed apprenticeships at the site) John Storey who became Premier of NSW and William McKell who became Governor-General of Australia.

The place is important in demonstrating aesthetic characteristics and/or a high degree of creative or technical achievement in New South Wales.

The site has a high level of aesthetic achievement becoming a distinctive landscape feature, with landmark qualities, apart from its engineering and industrial/maritime heritage value. The site represents significant technical achievement in the building of the first dry dock in the colony, opening one year before that Cockatoo Island. The site was further responsible for a number of engineering/technical innovation including the alleged development shipboard refrigerated transport.

The place has strong or special association with a particular community or cultural group in New South Wales for social, cultural or spiritual reasons.

The site is socially and culturally significant and is subject to a high level of community esteem. Mort's Dock was the largest private enterprise in the colony, contributing to the development of Balmain as a working class area. The site is unique for its contribution to the trade union movement with the establishment of the Ship Painters and Dockers Union in 1872, and the formation of what is now the Australian Labor Party 1891. It is further significant in providing a detailed picture of production and workplace relations issues at this time.

The place has potential to yield information that will contribute to an understanding of the cultural or natural history of New South Wales.

The site has the potential to yield scientific and archaeological information that will further contribute to an understanding of NSW cultural, industrial and maritime history. This high research potential is due to the survival of extant remains of the dry dock, caisson and patent slips. The structural remains have a high degree of integrity and intactness as a result of the ANL backfill which preserved the remaining fabric in situ. Mort's Dock is an important reference site, provides evidence of past maritime and industrial activity that is unavailable elsewhere in NSW.

The place possesses uncommon, rare or endangered aspects of the cultural or natural history of New South Wales.

The site is rare as it is thought to be one of only three surviving Australian examples of an in situ dry dock of that period. The site provides evidence of a defunct custom, process and way of life in NSW, shows unusually accurate evidence of past shipbuilding, engineering and manufacturing activity, that is important to the archaeological, engineering, heritage and trade union/labour communities in NSW.

The place is important in demonstrating the principal characteristics of a class of cultural or natural places/environments in New South Wales.

The site is representative of shipbuilding, ship repair, engineering and manufacturing works of that period, of the development of the colony and of Australia as a maritime nation. By 1917, 39 steamships, and seven Manly Ferries, had been constructed on the site, and significantly between 1940 and 1945, Mort's Dock constructed 14 of the 60 Bathurst class Corvettes built in Australia, four of the 12 River Class frigates, and a 1000-ton capacity floating dock, without which Australia would have suffered during the war effort. Furthermore, the site is outstanding because of its setting, condition, integrity and esteem in which it is held.

== See also ==
- Wagon Mound (No 1)
- Poole & Steel, which also had facilities located in Balmain
- Fitzroy Dock, another mid-C19th dry dock on Sydney Harbour
- Sutherland Dock, a late C19th dry dock on Sydney Harbour
- Woolwich Dock, an early C20th dry dock on Sydney Harbour
