= HMAS Toowoomba (J157) =

1941 Bathurst-class corvette

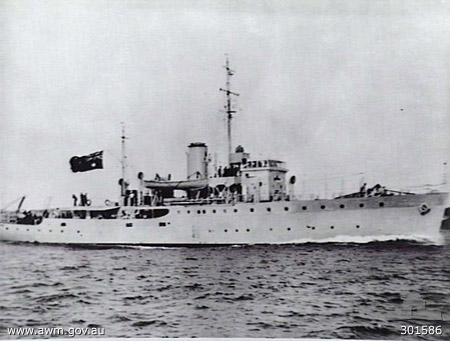
- HMAS Toowoomba during sea trials in 1941

History

Australia
- Namesake: City of Toowoomba, Queensland
- Builder: Walkers Limited in Maryborough, Queensland
- Laid down: 6 August 1940
- Launched: 26 March 1941
- Commissioned: 9 October 1941
- Decommissioned: 5 July 1946
- Motto: "Fearless"
- Honours and awards: Battle honours: Pacific 1942; Indian Ocean 1942–44
- Fate: Transferred to RNN
- Badge

Netherlands
- Name: Boeroe
- Commissioned: 5 July 1946
- Out of service: 1958
- Fate: Removed from service

General characteristics
- Class & type: Bathurst-class corvette
- Displacement: 650 tons (standard), 1,025 tons (full war load)
- Length: 186 ft (57 m)
- Beam: 31 ft (9.4 m)
- Draught: 8.5 ft (2.6 m)
- Propulsion: triple expansion engine, 2 shafts
- Speed: 15 knots (28 km/h; 17 mph) at 1,750 hp
- Complement: 85
- Armament: 1 × 4-inch Mk XIX gun (later replaced by 1 × 12-pounder gun, then reinstalled); 3 × 20 mm Oerlikons (later 2); 1 × 40 mm Bofors 40 mm L/60 gun (installed later); Machine guns; Depth charges chutes and throwers

HMAS Toowoomba (J157/B251/A125), named for the city of Toowoomba, Queensland was one of 60 Bathurst-class corvettes constructed during World War II and one of 20 built on Admiralty order but manned by personnel of and later commissioned into the Royal Australian Navy (RAN). The ship later served in the Royal Netherlands Navy (RNN) as HNLMS Boeroe.

== Design and construction ==
In 1938, the Australian Commonwealth Naval Board (ACNB) identified the need for a general purpose 'local defence vessel' capable of both anti-submarine and mine-warfare duties, while easy to construct and operate. The vessel was initially envisaged as having a displacement of approximately 500 tons, a speed of at least 10 knots (19 km/h; 12 mph), and a range of 2,000 nautical miles (3,700 km; 2,300 mi) The opportunity to build a prototype in the place of a cancelled Bar-class boom defence vessel saw the proposed design increased to a 680-ton vessel, with a 15.5 knots (28.7 km/h; 17.8 mph) top speed, and a range of 2,850 nautical miles (5,280 km; 3,280 mi), armed with a 4-inch gun, equipped with asdic, and able to fitted with either depth charges or minesweeping equipment depending on the planned operations: although closer in size to a sloop than a local defence vessel, the resulting increased capabilities were accepted due to advantages over British-designed mine warfare and anti-submarine vessels. Construction of the prototype HMAS Kangaroo did not go ahead, but the plans were retained. The need for locally built 'all-rounder' vessels at the start of World War II saw the "Australian Minesweepers" (designated as such to hide their anti-submarine capability, but popularly referred to as "corvettes") approved in September 1939, with 60 constructed during the course of the war: 36 ordered by the RAN, 20 (including Toowoomba) ordered by the British Admiralty but manned and commissioned as RAN vessels, and 4 for the Royal Indian Navy.

Toowoomba was laid down by Walkers Limited at Maryborough, Queensland on 6 August 1940. She launched on 26 March 1941, in a ceremony presided over by Mrs. C. W. Lowther, the wife of a long serving employee of the shipyard. Toowoomba was commissioned on 9 October 1941.

== Operational history ==
=== RAN ===
Toowoomba entered operational service immediately on commissioning. She was initially based in Sydney, and was tasked with convoy escort duties along the east coast of Australia until January 1942, when Toowoomba and two sister ships were ordered to Batavia. Toowoomba was in constant action over the next two months, and on 14 February was one of the last ships to enter Singapore Harbour before it was captured by the Japanese.

Retreating to Fremantle, Western Australia after the capture of Singapore, Toowoomba was repaired and recommenced convoy escort duties, this time on the west coast of Australia and with a new captain and crew, until assignment to the British Eastern Fleet on 23 November 1942. During this time, she was involved in escort and patrol duties across the Indian Ocean, reaching as far west as the Persian Gulf. On 22 November 1944, Toowoomba was assigned to the newly created British Pacific Fleet, and operated with the fleet until returning to Fremantle on 3 December 1944 for refit. The refit was completed in March 1945, and Toowoomba was assigned to escort and patrol duties between Australia and New Guinea until the end of hostilities.

Following the end of World War II, Toowoomba spent time in Hong Kong, performing minesweeping and hydrological survey duties. She returned to Australia in December 1945.

The corvette earned two battle honours for her wartime service, "Pacific 1942" and "Indian Ocean 1942–44".

=== RNLN ===
On 5 July 1946, Toowoomba decommissioned from RAN service and immediately commissioned into the Royal Netherlands Navy (RNLN). Renamed HNLMS Boeroe, she served with the RNLN until 1958.
