= Bathurst-class corvette =

Class of corvette in use by Royal Australian Navy

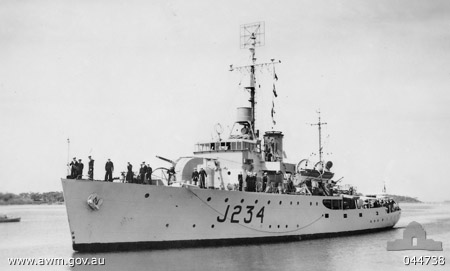
- HMAS Latrobe

Class overview
- Builders: Mort's Dock (15); Evans Deakin & Co. (11); HMA Naval Dockyard (8); Cockatoo Docks & Eng. Co. (7); Walkers Limited (7); Poole & Steel (7); BHP Shipyards (3); State Dockyard (1)
- Operators: World War II; Royal Australian Navy; Royal Indian Navy; Post-war; Indian Navy; Indonesian Navy; Royal New Zealand Navy; Royal Netherlands Navy; Turkish Naval Forces; People's Liberation Army Navy; Pakistan Navy
- Succeeded by: Ton-class minesweeper (RAN)
- Cost: A£250,000 per vessel
- Built: 1940–1942
- In commission: 1940–1960 (RAN)
- Completed: 60
- Cancelled: 3, plus a 1938 prototype
- Lost: 5
- Preserved: 2

General characteristics
- Type: Australian minesweeper (corvette)
- Displacement: 1,025 tons (full war load)
- Length: 186 ft (57 m)
- Beam: 31 ft (9.4 m)
- Draught: 8.5 ft (2.6 m)
- Propulsion: Triple expansion, 2 shafts. 2,000 hp
- Speed: 15 knots (28 km/h; 17 mph)
- Complement: Normally 85
- Sensors & processing systems: Type 128 asdic
- Armament: Varying, but generally: 1 × 12-pounder (76-mm) gun; or 1 × 4 inch (102-mm) Mk XIX gun; 1 × 40 mm Bofors gun; 2–3 × 20 mm Oerlikon guns; up to 40 depth charges
- Notes: Characteristics varied between vessels, see individual ships for details

The Bathurst-class corvettes were a class of general purpose vessels designed and built in Australia during World War II. Originally classified as minesweepers, but widely referred to as corvettes, the Bathurst-class vessels fulfilled a broad anti-submarine, anti-mine, and convoy escort role.

A total of 60 Bathurst-class corvettes were built, at eight Australian shipyards: 36 were paid for by the Australian government and 24 were built on British Admiralty orders. Of these UK-owned vessels, 20 were officially commissioned into the Royal Australian Navy (RAN), and manned by RAN personnel, while four served in the Royal Indian Navy; none of the UK-owned vessels was commissioned into the Royal Navy. An order for three more Bathursts, to be constructed in India, was cancelled before they were laid down.

Although the Bathursts were designed for the anti-submarine and anti-mine roles, they also served as troop and supply transports, provided air defence for convoys and disabled ships, participated in shore bombardments, and undertook hydrographic surveys. Three ships were lost during the war: one to an air attack and two to collisions with friendly merchant ships. (Following the war, a fourth vessel sank after hitting a mine while sweeping the Great Barrier Reef.)

After the war, the Admiralty ships were sold to the Turkish Navy, Royal Netherlands Navy, and civilian operators, while several RAN-owned vessels were transferred to the Royal New Zealand Navy, temporarily reactivated to facilitate National Service Training, or sold to civilians. Four of the Dutch Bathursts were transferred to the Indonesian Navy; one of these was destroyed in 1956 by anti-government rebels. The rest of the RAN and Admiralty ships were sold for scrap to help fund other projects. Two vessels are preserved as museum ships.

== Background ==
In 1937, in an initially unrelated development, the Australian Commonwealth Naval Board (ACNB) approved the procurement of three net-laying boom defence vessels. However, in February 1938, the ACNB also identified a need for a class of general purpose, 'local defence vessels' that were easy to construct and operate. (This need emerged from plans for a training tender attached to the RAN anti-submarine warfare training school.) The ships had to be capable of both anti-submarine and minesweeping duties. Consequently, the number of Bar-class boom defence vessels ordered was reduced to two, and resources for the third were re-allocated to a prototype local defence vessel.

During July 1938, the RAN Director of Engineering, Rear Admiral Percival McNeil, was instructed to develop plans for a local defence vessel, with a displacement of approximately 500 tons, a speed of at least 10 knots (19 km/h; 12 mph), and a range of 2,000 nautical miles (3,700 km; 2,300 mi). McNeil completed his drawings in February 1939; his proposal called for a 680-ton vessel, with a speed of 15.5 knots (28.7 km/h; 17.8 mph), and a range of 2,850 nautical miles (5,280 km; 3,280 mi). McNeil's unbuilt prototype – sometimes known as HMAS Kangaroo – more closely resembled a sloop than the original concept of a local defence vessel; the increase in size and speed also meant the vessel would have been more versatile than originally envisioned. It would have been equipped with a 4-inch gun, ASDIC and either depth charge launchers or minesweeping equipment, depending on operational requirements. In the meantime, however, the order for three net-laying vessels was re-instated before construction of McNeil's prototype could begin. (The second of these Bar-class boom vessels to be commissioned was instead named Kangaroo.)

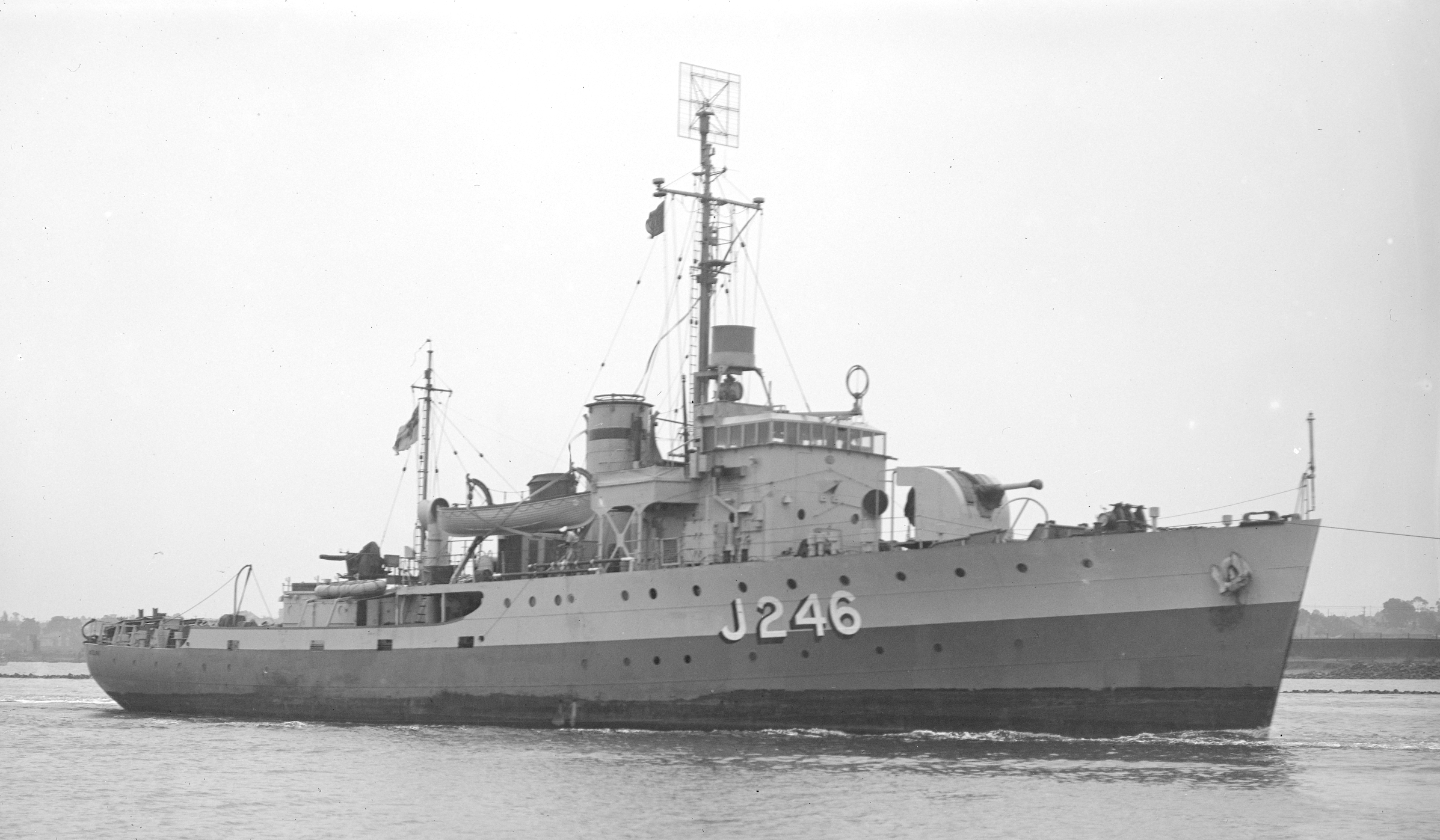
HMAS Fremantle.

Although McNeil's "Kangaroo class" was never built, his general concept attracted interest in Australian naval circles, as it offered advantages over existing minesweeper and anti-submarine classes and could be built in Australia with local resources, with the exception of weapons and some specialised instrumentation. Although not perfectly suited for any specific role, the all-round general capability for minesweeping, anti-submarine warfare, patrol, and escort duties was seen as a good short-term solution until better vessels could be requisitioned or constructed.

In September 1939, following the outbreak of war, there was a new procurement process for seven ships of a design based on McNeil's concept. Additional orders were soon placed by both the ACNB and the British Admiralty, and a total of 60 Bathurst-class ships were built, including 36 ordered by the RAN for home duties and 24 paid for by the Admiralty. Of these British-ordered vessels, 20 vessels were commissioned into the RAN and crewed by Australian personnel, on the understanding that they would be attached to Royal Navy fleets; a further four vessels were commissioned into the Royal Indian Navy.

The Bathurst class were officially classified as "Australian Minesweepers" (AMS) to hide their intended primary role in anti-submarine duties, although the Bathursts were popularly referred to as corvettes.

== Design ==
Each ship's company varied in size: the standard complement was 85, including 6 commissioned and 12 to 13 non-commissioned officers. Over 20,000 personnel served on a Bathurst during the war: the early ships were primarily manned by reservists, while the majority of the 'Hostilities Only' personnel recruited during the war served on a Bathurst-class vessel sometime during their career. Sailors were accommodated in ten-man messdecks, which were small, poorly lit rooms that were perpetually damp from seawater and sweat. In anything but calm weather, hatches and portholes would have to be closed: sunlight and fresh air was a rarity inside the hull. Because of the conditions, high rates of sickness (particularly pneumonia and tuberculosis) were experienced. Officers slept in cabins with bunks (as opposed to hammocks), and ate and relaxed in each ship's wardroom, complete with bar and steward service. The difference in conditions between officers and sailors prompted tensions between these two groups.

Six large escort vessels based on a scaled-up version of the Bathurst design were considered for construction in mid-1941, but the design was determined to be inferior to the River-class frigate.

=== Armament and equipment ===
The most common armament for Bathurst-class corvettes was a 12-pounder gun or a 4-inch Mark XIX high-angle gun, three Oerlikon 20 mm cannons, two Lewis .303 machine guns, and two .303 Vickers machine guns. The corvettes carried up to 40 depth charges, which were deployed by 4 throwers and 2 chutes. Many of the 12-pounder carrying corvettes were refitted with the 4-inch during their service life, while one of the Oerlikons was often replaced with a Bofors 40 mm gun. Bathursts equipped with the 4-inch main gun were primarily allocated to northern waters, because of the increased air threat and the greater anti-aircraft capabilities of the 4-inch compared to the 12-pounder gun mounted on other corvettes.

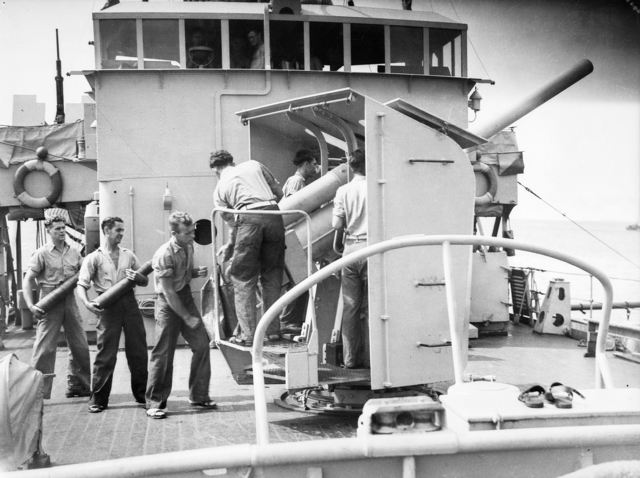
HMAS Cowra's 4-inch Mk XIX gun during a training exercise in 1945

Due to the variety of shipyards constructing the corvettes, as well as the varying roles the Bathursts were pressed into, there was no true standardisation of armament. Some ships varied significantly from the common armament profile, while an individual ship's weapons outfit could vary significantly for different periods of her career. At one stage, HMAS Geraldton carried six Oerlikon cannons, a number later reduced to four. By comparison, the outfit of HMAS Junee consisted of a single 4-inch gun and a single 40 mm gun.

The Bathursts were equipped with modified Type 128 asdic equipment, redesigned to be used without a gyroscopic stabiliser. Minesweeping equipment also varied across the class: ships equipped with the newer 'LL' minesweeping gear were distributed as evenly as possible throughout major Australian ports.

Each was fitted with a triple expansion steam engine (usually fabricated by railway workshops) to drive two propellers at a theoretical maximum speed of 15.5 knots (28.7 km/h; 17.8 mph), although this required ideal conditions and was rarely achieved.

== Construction ==
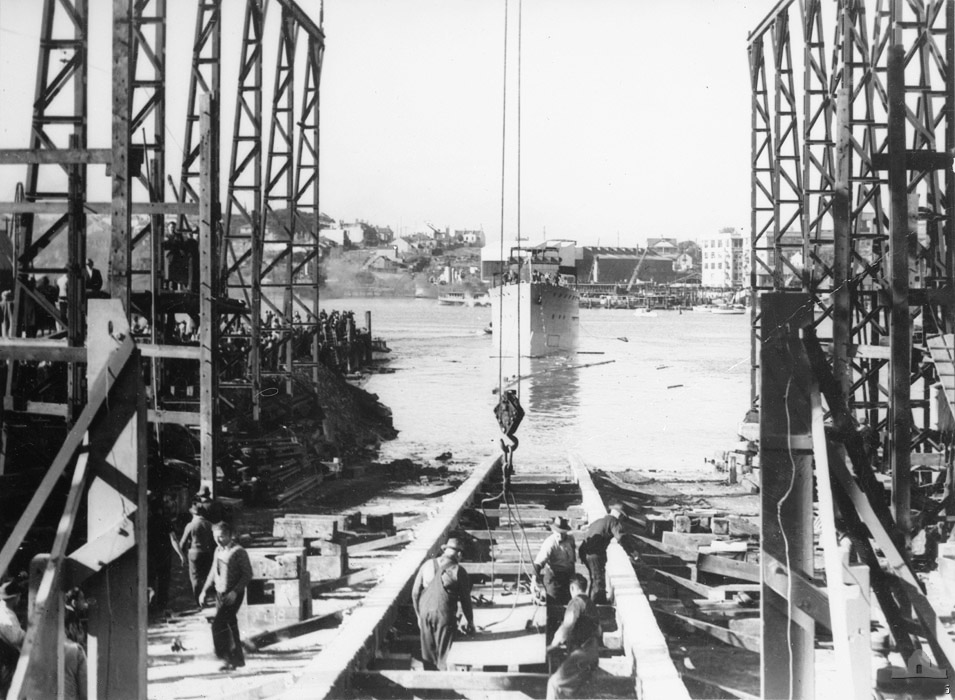
Minutes after the launch of HMAS Deloraine at Mort's Dock & Engineering Company workers begin preparations to lay down the next vessel.

Construction of the ships required a significant expansion of the Australian shipbuilding industry. This was achieved by bringing disused dockyards back into production and establishing new facilities. The lead shipyard was Cockatoo Docks & Engineering Company in Sydney, which laid down the first ship, HMAS Bathurst, in February 1940, and produced a further seven vessels. The other seven shipyards involved were Walkers Limited in Maryborough, Queensland (7 ships), Evans Deakin & Company in Brisbane (11 ships), Mort's Dock & Engineering Company in Sydney (14 ships), Poole & Steel in Sydney (7 ships), State Dockyard at Newcastle, New South Wales (1 ship), HMA Naval Dockyard at Williamstown, Victoria (8 ships), and BHP at Whyalla, South Australia (4 ships). Each ship cost approximately A£250,000 to build.

The initial rate of construction was slow, due to a variety of factors: delays in equipment delivery from overseas, industrial problems, a lack of qualified labour, and the difficulty of naval overseers in supporting all eight shipyards at once primary among them. The initial prediction was that two vessels per month would enter service through 1941, but by June 1940, only five of the seventeen ordered so far had been laid down, and the RAN was advised at the end of 1940 that only seven would be completed December 1940. The prioritisation of Admiralty orders by the Australian government meant that RAN-ordered ships were further delayed, although the Admiralty later allowed the first four of their ships to remain in local waters until replacements entered service. Rate of construction increased by late 1941, although the increasing need of shipbuilding resources for repairs as the war progressed slowed the rate of construction back down. The corvette's build time was comparable to that of an Essex-class aircraft carrier; the fourteen-month construction time for USS Franklin was equal to or faster than the individual build time of half the corvettes.

Three additional Bathursts were to be built for the Royal Indian Navy by Garden Reach of Calcutta. All three were laid down on 3 May 1943, but were cancelled and broken up on the slipways in March 1945. Instead, three Flower-class corvettes were transferred from the Royal Navy to India.

== Role ==
The two main purposes the ships were intended for were minesweeping and anti-submarine escort. However, the corvettes found themselves performing a wide range of duties, including troop and supply transport, bombardment, assault landings support, survey and hydrography mapping, and providing aid to disabled ships. The Bathursts were seen as 'maids of all work' by the RAN, even though the design was inappropriate for some roles; being too small, too slow, or inadequately armed or equipped. It was not until March 1943 that sufficient ships were available to take the individual variations and capabilities of the Bathursts into account: prior to this, they were the first (and often only) available vessel.

Because of the dual, conflicting roles of local defence vessel and ocean-going escort, Bathursts based in Australia were under two different controllers for the first part of the Pacific War; operationally under the US Navy's Naval Commander South West Pacific Area Forces (COMSOUWESTPAC), and administratively under the Naval Officer In Charge (NOIC) of the ship's homeport. Following multiple incidents where a ship would be assigned to two different tasks simultaneously; conflicts between local needs, escort schedules, and maintenance requirements; and protests from the NOIC in Fremantle and Darwin, the Australian-based corvettes were placed completely under NOIC control in May 1942. Instead of directly assigning ships to convoys, COMSOUWESTPAC would indicate that ships would be needed from a particular port for escort duties, leaving the NOIC of that port free to allocate available ships.

Bathurst-class ships were assigned up to three different pennant numbers during the course of their career. With the exception of HMAS Ararat (K34), all of the Bathurst-class corvettes were given numbers with the 'J' flag superior, designating them as minesweepers. Ships of the class that served with the British Pacific Fleet, like many other ships serving with the fleet, had their pennant numbers changed to ones with a 'B' flag superior. At the end of World War II, a reorganisation of the pennant system saw the Bathursts given new numbers with 'M' as the flag superior, which was the new designator for minesweepers.

== Operational history ==
=== World War II ===
In the early part of their war service, Bathursts were involved in the evacuation of several locations which fell to the initial Japanese advance, and in the transportation of supplies and reinforcements to Australian and Dutch guerrilla operations in Timor. HMAS Armidale was the only ship of the class destroyed by enemy action; she was sunk by torpedoes from Japanese aircraft on the afternoon of 1 December 1942 while transporting personnel of the Netherlands East Indies Army to Betano, Timor. It was for exemplary courage during this action that Ordinary Seaman Teddy Sheean was awarded, posthumously, the Victoria Cross.

The Bathursts were involved in several attacks on submarines during the war. On 20 January 1942, the Japanese submarine I-124 was sunk outside Darwin. This, the first RAN kill of a full-size submarine, was credited to HMAS Deloraine, with sister ships Katoomba and Lithgow assisting. On 11 September 1943, HMAS Wollongong assisted in the destruction of the German submarine U-617. On 11 February 1944, the corvettes Ipswich and Launceston, along with the Indian sloop HMIS Jumna, were responsible for the sinking of the Japanese submarine Ro-110 in the Bay of Bengal.

In November 1942, an Indian Bathurst, HMIS Bengal, along with the Dutch tanker Ondina she was escorting, engaged and sank the Japanese commerce raider Hōkoku Maru, and drove off her sister ship Aikoku Maru.

In early 1943, HMA Ships Benalla and Shepparton were modified to serve as hydrographic survey ships. The corvettes were assigned to Task Group 70.5 of the United States Seventh Fleet, and were used to survey waters prior to several amphibious landings during the war.

Eight corvettes were deployed to the Mediterranean in May 1943. Their anti-aircraft armament made them appropriate for escort duties during the Allied invasion of Sicily. A month later, four Bathursts were part of an eight-ship escort for a 40-strong convoy to Gibraltar when it was attacked by 50 German torpedo bombers; the corvettes' air defence destroyed nine aircraft, and only two merchant ships received damage. During their time in the Mediterranean, several corvettes reached the Atlantic Ocean.

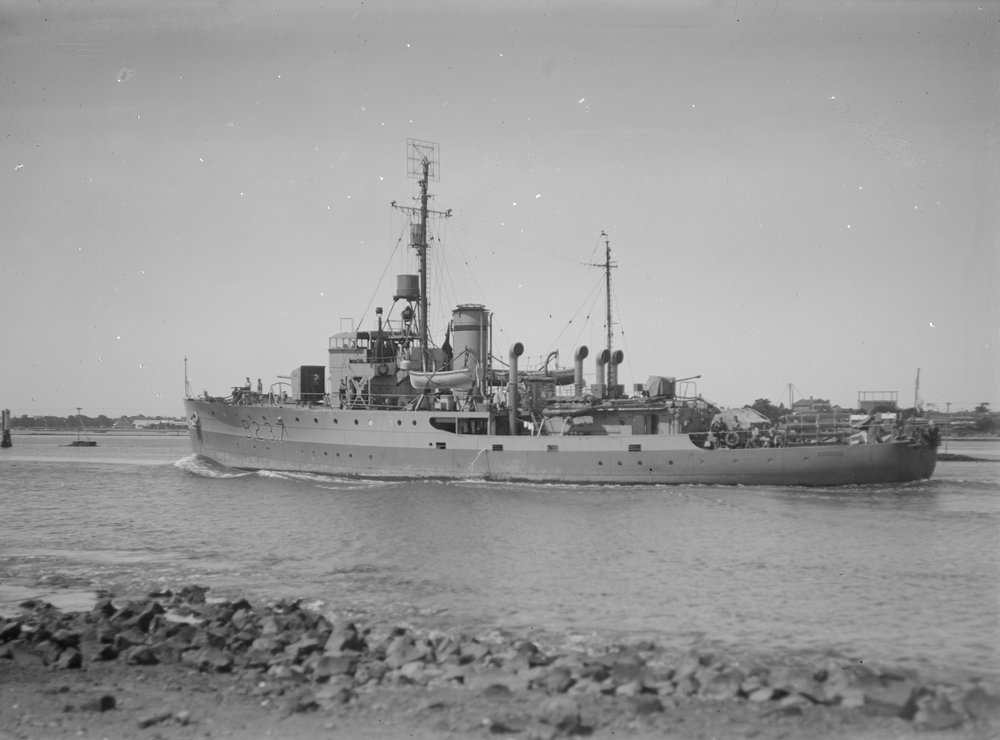
HMAS Bendigo, one of 18 Bathurst-class corvettes assigned to the British Pacific Fleet, underway in 1945

In early 1945, eighteen Bathurst-class corvettes were assigned to the British Pacific Fleet. Eight of these ships cleared Victoria Harbour before the BPF arrived in Hong Kong at the end of the Japanese occupation, while three-Ballarat, Cessnock, and Ipswich-were present in Tokyo Bay when the Japanese Instrument of Surrender was signed.

The poor working and living conditions aboard the ships, combined with the heavy and often difficult workloads, led to mutinous acts aboard four ships during the war: Toowoomba, Lithgow, Geraldton, and Pirie. The incidents in Geraldton and Lithgow were minor and resolved without disciplinary charges, while the 'mutiny' aboard Toowoomba was caused by a lack of communication: after a hard day loading supplies, the sailors did not respond to an order to assemble on the quarterdeck as they felt they had laboured enough that day, but changed their mind when informed that the order to assemble was so the captain could thank them for their efforts, and reward them with drinks. However, the Pirie mutiny was far more serious: the ship's company were unable to respect their commanding officer, who was an ineffective leader but an overly strict disciplinarian with a superiority complex. This lack of respect was compounded while repairs were made to the corvette following an air attack off Oro Bay in April 1943, when the captain forced the rest of the company to live aboard, while he took residence at a hotel. A lack of pay, mail, and shore leave contributed to the sailors' frustration, and in response, 45 junior sailors refused to report for duties on 9 May until they could present their grievances to the commander. In response, he had the ship surrounded by armed guards and disabled the main gun. A Board of Inquiry failed to identify any ringleaders, and the problem was handed back to Pirie's commander to solve as he saw fit: fourteen men were charged with mutiny, with ten sent to prison. Relationships between commander and company did not improve until he was replaced at the end of 1943 for his botched handling of the event.

Only three Bathurst-class corvettes were lost during World War II. As well as Armidale, the other two ships were lost following collisions with merchant vessels of the United States: HMAS Wallaroo in June 1943, and HMAS Geelong in October 1944.

=== Post-war ===
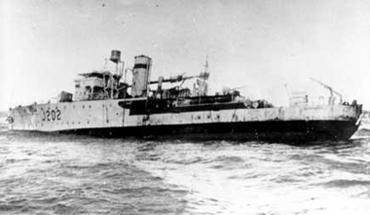
HMAS Warrnambool sinking after she struck a mine on 13 September 1947

After the war, the 20 Admiralty-owned vessels were disposed of; five to the Turkish Navy, eight to the Royal Netherlands Navy, and one to China, with the rest converted and sold for civilian use or broken up for scrap. Four of the Dutch Bathursts were later sold on to the Indonesian Navy. One of these, HMAS Ipswich, renamed KRI Hang Tuah, was bombed and sunk on 28 April 1958 by a CIA-operated Douglas B-26 Invader operating in support of Permesta rebels opposed to the Guided Democracy in Indonesia established the previous year.

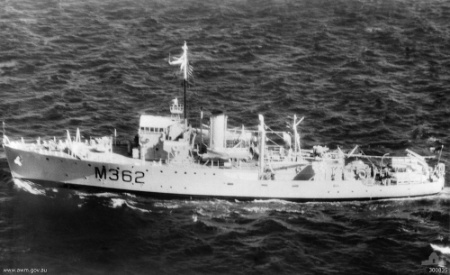
HMAS Junee, modified for service as a training ship, underway in 1954

Of the 33 surviving RAN vessels, twelve were formed into the 20th Minesweeping Flotilla and tasked with clearing minefields deployed during the war in the waters of Australia, New Guinea, and the Solomons. HMAS Warrnambool was sunk by an Australian mine in the Great Barrier Reef in September 1947. Several ships were also used to transport soldiers and liberated prisoners of war. The corvettes were then placed in operational reserve, with the intention that they be reactivated for escort work in the event of another war or international crisis. Most were sold off during the 1950s, including four to the Royal New Zealand Navy, to help offset the cost of acquiring and operating two aircraft carriers. Four corvettes (Colac, Cowra, Gladstone, and Latrobe) were recommissioned in 1951 as training vessels for the National Service Program. Junee was reactivated in 1953 for the same purpose. The RAN component of the program ended in 1957.

The last ship to leave RAN service was HMAS Wagga on 28 October 1960. The gradual loss of minesweeping-capable ships was not rectified until late 1962, when the RAN purchased six Ton-class minesweepers from the Royal Navy.

The 56 corvettes commissioned as Australian vessels travelled a combined total of 6,700,000 nautical miles (12,400,000 km; 7,700,000 mi) during their service with the RAN. A total of 83 personnel were killed in service across the entire service life of the class.

== Operators ==
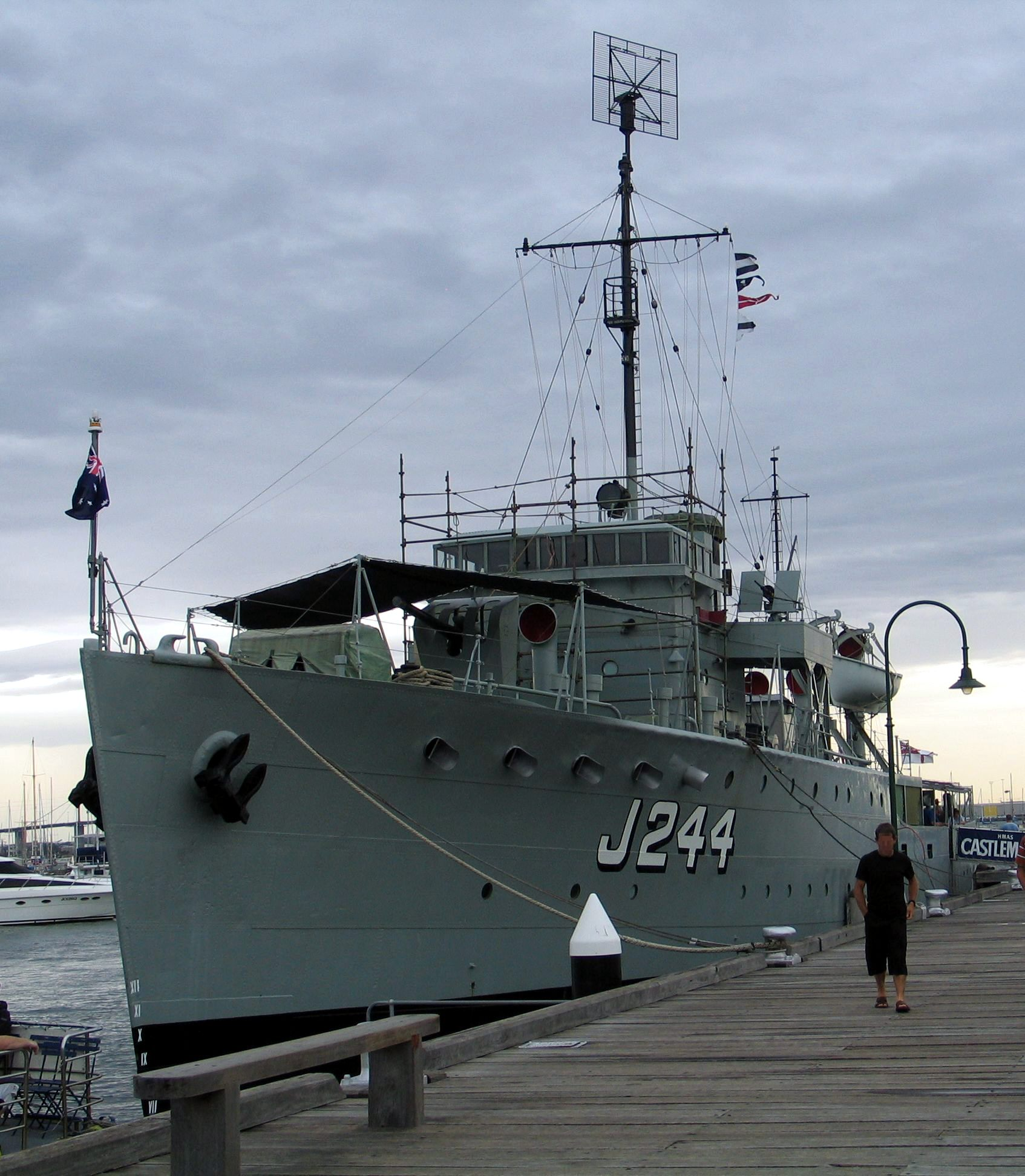
HMAS Castlemaine on display in Williamstown, Victoria. Castlemaine is one of two Bathurst-class corvettes preserved as museum ships.

=== World War II ===
- Royal Australian Navy
- Royal Indian Navy; later Indian Navy

=== Post-war ===
- Indonesian Navy
- Royal New Zealand Navy
- Royal Netherlands Navy
- Turkish Navy
- Pakistan Navy
- Civilian operators; one vessel later acquired by People's Liberation Army Navy

== Surviving examples and monuments ==
Of the 60 vessels, only two examples remain. HMAS Castlemaine is a museum ship in Williamstown, Victoria. HMAS Whyalla is a land-based tourist attraction in Whyalla.

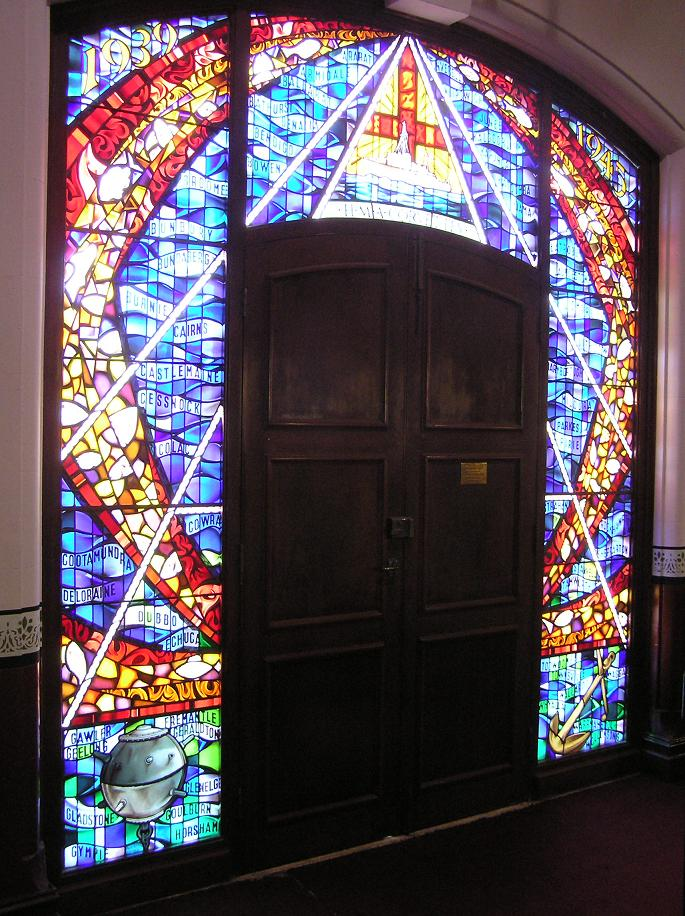
Stained-glass window listing the names of the Bathurst-class corvettes serving in the RAN during World War II

A monument to the 56 Australian-operated corvettes is located at the Royal Australian Navy Heritage Centre, at Garden Island, Sydney. The monument, Corvettes, was unveiled by Rear Admiral Peter Sinclair on 12 November 1995. Also at Garden Island, Sydney, a stained glass window listing the names of the corvettes frames the upper balcony doors of the Naval Chapel.

The Royal Australian Navy Corvettes memorial at the Fremantle War Memorial was dedicated on 7 October 1984.

== See also ==
- List of ship classes of the Second World War
