= Poole & Steel =

Australian engineering company

Poole & Steel was a major Australian engineering, railway rolling stock manufacturer and shipbuilding company. It had facilities located in Balmain, New South Wales and Osborne, South Australia.

== History ==
The company was set up by Arthur Hugh Poole and James Steel, and the Balmain yard was in operation by 1902. In first decade of the 20th century, it made ships, railway wagons, and notably, gold dredges, production of which boomed during that decade.

The shipyard at Osborne was established in 1919. It was sold to the Government of South Australia in 1937.

It became a public company, Poole and Steel Limited, in late 1944. The Balmain yard was subject to a protracted industrial dispute, in 1946, that resulted in Poole and Steel and all other privately owned shipyards on the harbour joining forces in a lockout. The company remained profitable into the 1950s, but eventually became a victim of the declining significance of local shipping, reduced work for the navy, industrial disputes and high costs, de facto removal of industry protection, and overseas competition. The Balmain yard appears to have effectively ceased production by 1961.

== Products of Balmain ==
- HMAS Cootamundra
- HMAS Cowra
- HMAS Geraldton
- HMAS Junee
- HMAS Kapunda
- HMAS Katoomba
- HMAS Mollymawk
- HMAS Wallaroo
- No 5 dumb hopper barge
- Oil Fuel Lighter No 3
- Oil Fuel Lighter No 1204
- Gold dredges, for Wellington and Jembaicumbene.

== Products of Osborne ==
- 600 gondola cars for South Australian Railways
- 500 steel box cars for South Australian Railways
- 100 steel cars for South Australian Railways
- SS Eurimbla
- SS Euwarra
- SS Eugowra
- Dredges and barges for Harbour Board
- Bridge (Murray Bridge)

== See also ==
- Murrumbidgee River Bridge, Carrathool
