= QF 4-inch naval gun Mk XIX =

Ordnance QF 4 inch gun Mk XIX
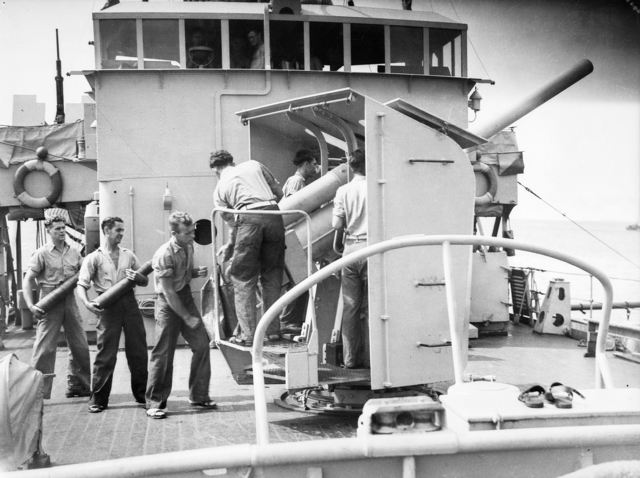
- Crew of HMAS Cowra at gun drill, Tarakan Island, June 1945
- Type: Dual-purpose gun

Service history
- In service: 1939
- Used by: Royal Navy; Royal Canadian Navy; Royal Australian Navy
- Wars: World War II

Production history
- Designed: 1938
- No. built: 2,023

Specifications
- Barrel length: 160 inches (4.064 m) bore (40 calibres)
- Shell: Fixed QF HE, Starshell
- Shell weight: 35 pounds (16 kg)
- Calibre: 4-inch (101.6 mm)
- Breech: horizontal sliding-block
- Elevation: -10° to +60°
- Muzzle velocity: 396 metres per second (1,300 ft/s)
- Maximum firing range: 8,870 metres (9,700 yd) at +40°

The QF 4-inch Mk XIX gun (Note: Mk XIX = Mark 19. Britain used Roman numerals to denote Marks (models) of ordnance until after World War II. This was the nineteenth model of British QF 4-inch gun) was a British low-velocity 4-inch 40-calibre naval gun used to arm small warships such as Bathurst and Castle-class corvette and some River-class frigate in World War II, mainly against submarines.

== Description ==
It succeeded the higher-velocity World War I-era BL 4-inch Mk IX (typically deployed on Flower-class corvettes in the escort role). The Mk XIX fired fixed ammunition which was 38.5 inches (0.98 m) long and weighed 50 pounds (23 kg). The weight of the projectile was increased from 31 pounds (14 kg) for the Mk IX to 35 pounds (16 kg) for the Mk XIX. The high-angle mounting used for the XIX added some anti-aircraft capability and allowed it to fire starshells to illuminate the battle area at night.

== Ammunition ==
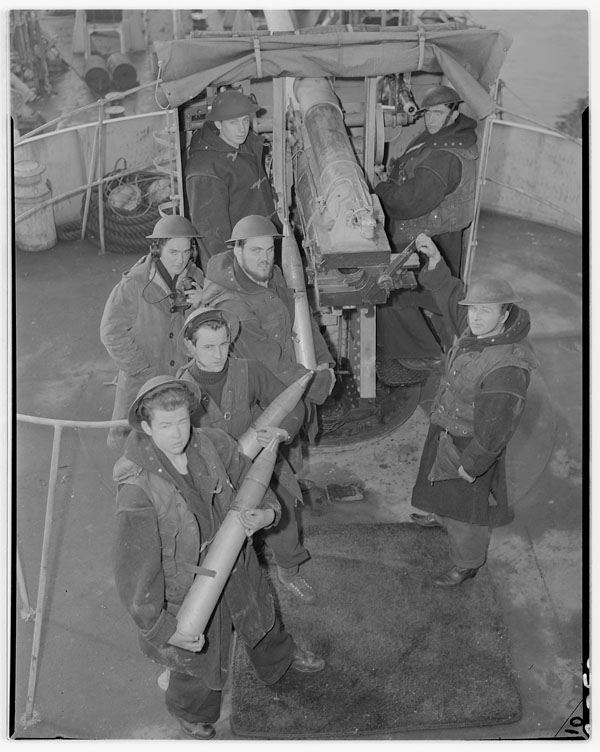
Canadian gunners with fixed rounds

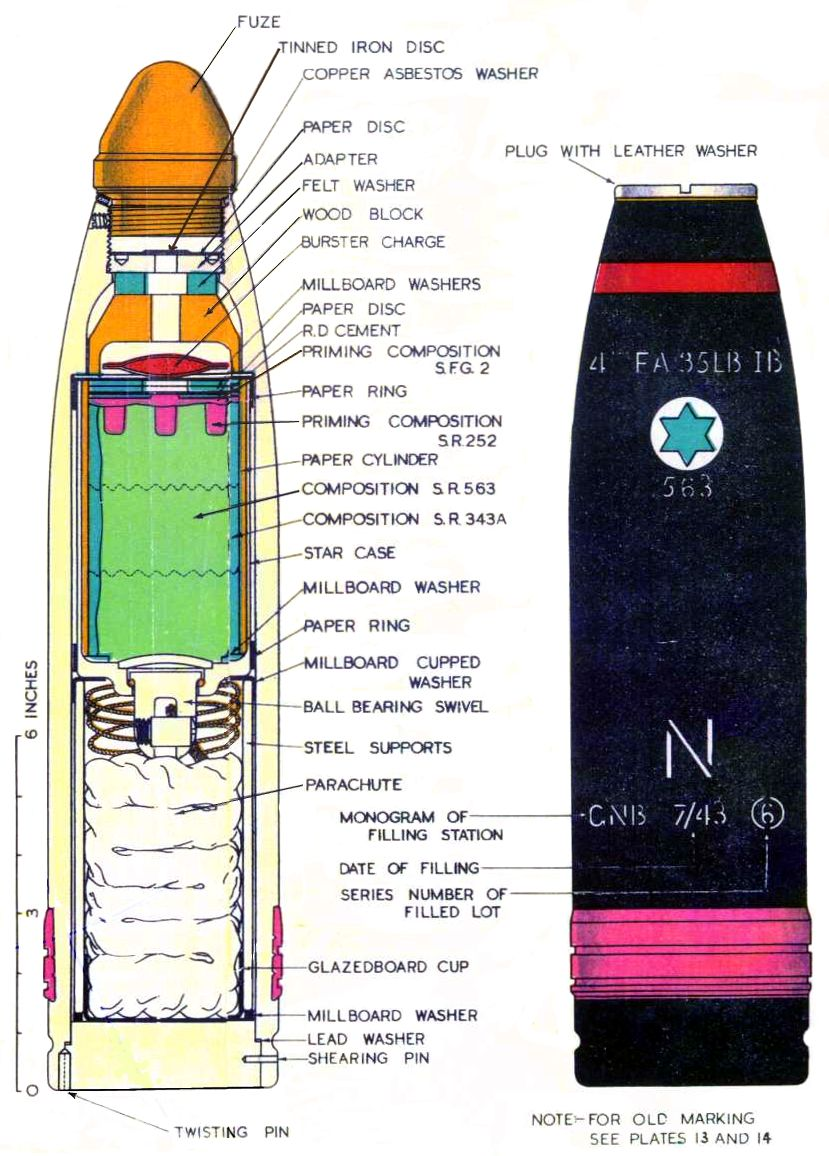
Starshell

== Surviving examples ==
- On HMAS Castlemaine at Williamstown, Victoria, Australia.
- On the parade ground at the Irish Naval Service Base, Haulbowline, Co. Cork, Ireland

== Bibliography ==
- John Campbell, "Naval Weapons Of World War Two", Annapolis : Naval Institute Press, 1985, ISBN 0-87021-459-4
