= List of Bathurst-class corvettes =

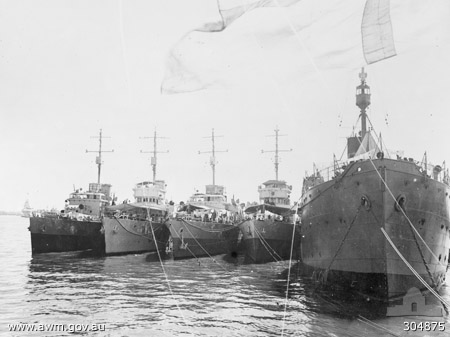
Four Australian Bathurst-class corvettes alongside a depot ship at Columbo, Ceylon in November 1944

The Bathurst-class corvettes were a ship class of sixty vessels built in Australia during World War II and initially operated by the Royal Australian Navy (RAN), the British Admiralty (although the ships were crewed by and commissioned into the RAN) and the Royal Indian Navy. Following the conclusion of World War II, many of the ships were sold or transferred to other organisations, and saw service in the Royal Navy, Royal Netherlands Navy, Royal New Zealand Navy, Indonesian Navy, Turkish Navy, Pakistan Navy and civilian service.

This list is divided into two sections. The first section, Primary service, lists the sixty vessels during their initial period of service, up until their decommissioning. Secondary service lists any vessels which later served in other navies, entered civilian service, or were recommissioned into the RAN for training purposes.

== Primary service ==
36 of the Bathurst class were constructed for and crewed by the Royal Australian Navy (RAN). All of the four corvettes lost during activities related to World War II are in this group.

20 Bathurst-class ships were constructed for the British Admiralty, but were crewed by and commissioned into the Royal Australian Navy.

4 Bathurst-class corvettes were constructed for the Royal Indian Navy (RIN). On 15 August 1947, India gained independence from the British Empire. After this date, the navy was referred to as the Indian Navy, and the prefix of all ships was changed from HMIS to INS.

Bathurst-class corvettes - Primary service
Prefix	Name	Operator	Builder	Laid down	Launched	Commissioned	Paid off	Fate
HMAS	Ararat	RAN	Evans Deakin & Company	6 July 1942	20 February 1943	16 June 1943	11 April 1947	Sold into private ownership, 6 January 1961
HMAS	Armidale	RAN	Mort's Dock & Engineering Company	1 September 1941	24 January 1942	11 June 1942	-	Sunk by 13 Japanese aircraft, 1 December 1942
HMAS	Ballarat	Admiralty	HMA Naval Dockyard	19 April 1940	10 December 1940	30 August 1941	27 September 1946	Sold into private ownership
HMAS	Bathurst	Admiralty	Cockatoo Island Dockyard	10 February 1940	1 August 1940	6 December 1940	27 September 1946	Sold for scrap, 21 June 1948
HMAS	Benalla	RAN	HMA Naval Dockyard	24 March 1942	19 December 1942	27 April 1943	28 January 1946	Sold for scrap, 20 February 1958
HMAS	Bendigo	Admiralty	Cockatoo Island Dockyard	12 August 1940	1 March 1941	10 May 1941	1946-09-27	Sold into private ownership, 5 May 1947
HMIS	Bengal	RIN	Morts Dock & Engineering Company	3 December 1941	7 July 1942	8 August 1942	1960	-
HMIS	Bombay	RIN	Morts Dock & Engineering Company	19 July 1941	6 December 1941	24 April 1942	1960	Sold for scrap, 1961
HMAS	Broome	Admiralty	Evans Deakin & Company	3 May 1941	6 August 1941	29 June 1942	29 June 1946	Transferred to the Turkish Navy
HMAS	Bowen	RAN	Walkers Limited	9 February 1942	28 July 1942	9 November 1942	17 January 1946	Sold for scrap, 18 May 1956
HMAS	Bunbury	RAN	Evans Deakin & Company	1 November 1941	16 May 1942	3 January 1943	26 August 1946	Sold for scrap, 6 January 1961
HMAS	Bundaberg	RAN	Evans Deakin & Company	7 June 1941	1 December 1941	12 September 1942	1946-03-26	Sold for scrap, 6 January 1961
HMAS	Burnie	Admiralty	Morts Dock & Engineering Company	4 June 1940	25 August 1940	15 April 1941	5 July 1946	Transferred to the Royal Netherlands Navy, 5 July 1946
HMAS	Cairns	Admiralty	Walkers Limited	31 March 1941	7 October 1941	11 March 1942	17 January 1946	Transferred to Royal Netherlands Navy, 17 January 1946
HMAS	Castlemaine	RAN	HMA Naval Dockyard	17 January 1941	7 August 1941	17 June 1942	14 December 1945	Training hulk at HMAS Cerberus until 1973-09, museum ship since late 1973
HMAS	Cessnock	Admiralty	Cockatoo Island Dockyard	16 April 1941	17 October 1941	26 January 1941	12 July 1946	Sold for scrap, 23 April 1947
HMAS	Colac	RAN	Morts Dock & Engineering Company	18 April 1941	30 August 1941	6 January 1942	30 January 1953	Tank cleaning vessel until 1983-09-30, sunk as a target by HMAS Ovens on 1987-03-04
HMAS	Cootamundra	RAN	Poole & Steel	26 February 1942	3 December 1942	30 April 1943	8 June 1959	Sold for scrap, 1962-03-28
HMAS	Cowra	RAN	Poole & Steel	12 August 1942	27 May 1943	8 October 1943	26 June 1953	Sold for scrap, 1961-01
HMAS	Deloraine	RAN	Morts Dock & Engineering Company	19 March 1941	26 July 1941	22 November 1941	30 June 1948	Sold for scrap, 1956-08-08
HMAS	Dubbo	RAN	Morts Dock & Engineering Company	13 October 1941	7 March 1942	31 July 1942	7 February 1947	Sold for scrap, 20 February 1958
HMAS	Echuca	RAN	HMA Naval Dockyard	22 February 1941	17 January 1942	7 September 1942	28 June 1948	Transferred to the Royal New Zealand Navy, 1952-03-05
HMAS	Fremantle	RAN	Evans Deakin & Company	11 February 1942	18 August 1942	24 March 1943	25 January 1946	Recommissioned as training ship, 1952
HMAS	Gawler	Admiralty	BHP	24 January 1941	4 October 1941	14 August 1942	5 April 1946	Transferred to the Turkish Navy, 1946-04-05
HMAS	Geelong	RAN	HMA Naval Dockyard	16 October 1940	22 April 1941	16 January 1942	-	Sunk following collision, 18 October 1944
HMAS	Geraldton	Admiralty	Poole & Steel	20 November 1940	16 August 1941	6 April 1942	14 June 1946	Transferred to the Turkish Navy, 14 June 1946
HMAS	Gladstone	RAN	Walkers Limited	4 August 1942	26 November 1942	22 March 1943	16 July 1956	Sold into civilian service, 1956
HMAS	Glenelg	RAN	Cockatoo Island Dockyard	2 March 1942	25 September 1942	16 November 1942	14 January 1946	Sold for scrap, 2 May 1957
HMAS	Goulburn	Admiralty	Cockatoo Island Dockyard	10 July 1940	16 November 1940	28 February 1941	27 September 1946	Sold into civilian service, 13 October 1947
HMAS	Gympie	RAN	Evans Deakin & Company	27 August 1941	30 January 1942	4 November 1942	23 May 1946	Sold for scrap, 6 January 1961
HMAS	Horsham	RAN	HMA Naval Dockyard	26 June 1941	16 May 1942	18 November 1942	17 December 1945	Sold for scrap, 8 August 1956
HMAS	Inverell	RAN	Morts Dock & Engineering Company	7 December 1941	2 May 1942	17 September 1942	14 June 1946	Transferred to the Royal New Zealand Navy, 5 March 1952
HMAS	Ipswich	Admiralty	Evans Deakin & Company	6 March 1941	11 August 1941	13 June 1942	5 July 1946	Transferred to the Royal Netherlands Navy, 5 July 1946
HMAS	Junee	RAN	Poole & Steel	17 February 1943	16 November 1943	11 April 1944	21 January 1946	Recommissioned as training ship, 25 February 1953
HMAS	Kalgoorlie	Admiralty	BHP	27 July 1940	7 August 1941	7 April 1942	1946-05-08	Transferred to the Royal Netherlands Navy, 8 May 1946
HMAS	Kapunda	RAN	Poole & Steel	27 August 1941	23 June 1942	21 October 1942	14 January 1946	Sold for scrap, 6 January 1961
HMAS	Katoomba	RAN	Poole & Steel	9 September 1940	16 April 1941	17 December 1941	2 August 1948	Sold for scrap, 2 May 1957
HMAS	Kiama	RAN	Evans Deakin & Company	2 November 1942	3 July 1943	26 January 1944	3 April 1946	Transferred to the Royal New Zealand Navy, 1952-03-05
HMAS	Latrobe	RAN	Morts Dock & Engineering Company	27 January 1942	19 June 1942	6 November 1942	13 March 1953	Sold for scrap, 18 May 1956
HMAS	Launceston	Admiralty	Evans Deakin & Company	23 December 1940	30 June 1941	9 April 1942	23 March 1946	Transferred to the Turkish Navy, 1946
HMAS	Lismore	Admiralty	Morts Dock & Engineering Company	26 February 1940	10 August 1940	24 January 1941	3 June 1956	Transferred to the Royal Netherlands Navy, 3 June 1946
HMAS	Lithgow	RAN	Morts Dock & Engineering Company	19 August 1940	21 December 1940	14 June 1941	8 June 1948	Sold for scrap, 8 October 1956
HMAS	Maryborough	Admiralty	Walkers Limited	16 April 1940	17 August 1940	12 June 1941	1945-12	Sold into private ownership, 9 May 1947
HMIS	Madras	RIN	Cockatoo Island Dockyard	4 August 1941	17 February 1942	12 May 1942	1960	-
HMAS	Mildura	RAN	Morts Dock & Engineering Company	23 September 1940	15 March 1941	23 July 1941	21 May 1948	Recommissioned as training ship, 1951
HMAS	Pirie	Admiralty	BHP	19 May 1941	3 December 1941	10 October 1942	5 April 1946	Transferred to the Turkish Navy, 5 April 1946
HMAS	Parkes	RAN	Evans Deakin & Company	16 March 1943	30 October 1943	25 May 1944	17 December 1945	Sold for scrap, 2 May 1957
HMIS	Punjab	RIN	Morts Dock & Engineering Company	26 May 1941	10 October 1941	20 March 1942	1949	Transferred to Pakistan during Partition of India.
HMAS	Rockhampton	RAN	Walkers Limited	6 November 1940	26 June 1941	21 January 1942	5 August 1946	Sold for scrap, 6 January 1961
HMAS	Shepparton	RAN	HMA Naval Dockyard	14 November 1941	15 August 1942	1 February 1943	10 May 1946	Sold for scrap, 20 February 1958
HMAS	Stawell	RAN	HMA Naval Dockyard	18 June 1942	3 April 1943	7 August 1943	26 March 1946	Transferred to the Royal New Zealand Navy, 5 March 1952
HMAS	Strahan	RAN	NSW State Dockyard	9 October 1942	12 July 1943	14 March 1944	25 January 1946	Sold for scrap, 6 January 1961
HMAS	Tamworth	Admiralty	Walkers Limited	25 August 1941	14 March 1942	8 August 1942	30 April 1946	Transferred to the Royal Netherlands Navy, 30 April 1946
HMAS	Townsville	RAN	Evans Deakin & Company	16 November 1940	13 May 1941	19 December 1941	5 August 1946	Sold for scrap, 8 August 1956
HMAS	Toowoomba	Admiralty	Walkers Limited	6 August 1940	26 March 1941	9 August 1941	5 July 1946	Transferred to the Royal Netherlands Navy, 5 July 1946
HMAS	Wagga	RAN	Morts Dock & Engineering Company	8 March 1942	25 July 1942	18 December 1942	28 November 1945	Recommissioned as training ship, 12 December 1951
HMAS	Wallaroo	RAN	Poole & Steel	24 April 1941	18 February 1942	15 July 1942	-	Sunk following collision, 11 June 1943
HMAS	Warrnambool	RAN	Morts Dock & Engineering Company	13 November 1940	8 May 1941	23 September 1941	-	Sunk by mine, 13 September 1947
HMAS	Whyalla	Admiralty	BHP	24 June 1940	12 May 1941	8 January 1942	16 May 1946	Sold into private ownership, 10 February 1947
HMAS	Wollongong	Admiralty	Cockatoo Island Dockyard	29 January 1941	5 July 1941	23 October 1941	11 February 1946	Transferred to the Royal Netherlands Navy, 11 February 1946

== Secondary service ==
Bathurst class corvettes - Secondary service
Prefix	Name	Original name	Operator	Origin	Commissioned/entered service	Decommissioned/left service	Fate
HMNZS	Inverell	HMAS Inverell	Royal New Zealand Navy	Acquired from RAN	5 March 1952	19 August 1976	Sold for scrap, 1 November 1977
	Isobel Queen	HMAS Maryborough	Australian General Trading and Shipping Syndicate	Purchased from RAN	9 May 1947	c. 1953	Sold for scrap in 1953
HMAS	Mildura	HMAS Mildura	Royal Australian Naval Reserve	Recommissioned as training vessel for National Service trainees	20 February 1951	11 September 1953	Towed to Brisbane for use as immobilised training hulk
	Mildura	HMAS Mildura	Royal Australian Naval Reserve	Used as immobilised training hulk	8 December 1954	c. 1965	Sold for scrap on 8 September 1965
HMS	Pirie	HMAS Pirie	Royal Navy	Acquired from RAN	5 April 1946	c. 1946	Transferred into the Turkish Navy
TCG	Amasra	HMAS Pirie	Turkish Navy	Acquired from Royal Navy	c. 1946	26 March 1984	Left service
HMNZS	Stawell	HMAS Stawell	Royal New Zealand Navy	Acquired from RAN	5 March 1952	c. late 1950s	Sold for scrap in July 1968
HNLMS	Tidore	HMAS Tamworth	Royal Netherlands Navy	Acquired from RAN	30 April 1946	c. December 1949	Transferred to the Indonesian Navy
KRI	Pati Unus	HMAS Tamworth	Indonesian Navy	Acquired from the Royal Netherlands Navy	c. December 1949	c. 1969	Left service
HNLMS	Boeroe	HMAS Toowoomba	Royal Netherlands Navy	Acquired from RAN	5 June 1946	c. 1958	Left service
HNLMS	Morotai	HMAS Ipswich	Royal Netherlands Navy	Acquired from RAN	5 July 1946	c. 1949	Transferred to the Indonesian Navy
KRI	Hang Tuah	HMAS Ipswich	Indonesian Navy	Acquired from the Royal Netherlands Navy	c. 1949	28 April 1958	Destroyed by mercenaries
HMAS	Wagga	HMAS Wagga	Royal Australian Naval Reserve	Recommissioned as training vessel for National Service trainees	12 December 1951	28 October 1960	Sold for scrap in March 1962
	Rip	HMAS Whyalla	Victorian Public Works Department	Acquired from RAN	10 February 1947	c. 1984	Sold to Whyalla City Council
HMAS	Whyalla	HMAS Whyalla	Whyalla City Council	Victorian Public Works Department	c. late 1984	-	Museum ship
		HMAS Ararat	Burns Philp of Darwin	Acquired from RAN	6 January 1961	c. 1961	Sold to Fujita Salvage Company of Japan
		HMAS Ararat	Fujita Salvage Company of Japan	Acquired from Burns Philp of Darwin	c. 1961		Scrapped
	Carmencita	HMAS Ballarat	Ta Hing Company (Hong Kong) Ltd	Acquired from RAN	December 1950	c. 1953	Sold for scrap
	Cheung Hing	HMAS Bendigo	Ta Hing Company (Hong Kong) Ltd	Acquired from RAN	5 May 1947	-	Acquired by People's Liberation Army Navy
	Loyang	HMAS Bendigo	People's Liberation Army Navy	Acquired from Ta Hing Company (Hong Kong) Ltd	-	c. 1988	Last record of service
HMNZS	Kiama	HMAS Kiama	Royal New Zealand Navy	Acquired from the RAN	date unknown	19 August 1976	Disposed of
HNLMS	Ceram	HMAS Burnie	Royal Netherlands Navy	Acquired from the RAN	5 July 1946	1958	Left service
HNLMS	Ambon	HMAS Cairns	Royal Netherlands Navy	Acquired from the RAN	17 January 1946	1950	Transferred to the Indonesian Navy
KRI	Banteng	HMAS Cairns	Indonesian Navy	Acquired from the Royal Netherlands Navy	6 April 1950	c. 1968	Sold for scrap

== Citations ==
Unless indicated here, all information is taken from each ship's corresponding Ship History page on the Sea Power Centre website.
