= HMAS Bunbury (J241) =

1942 Bathurst-class corvette

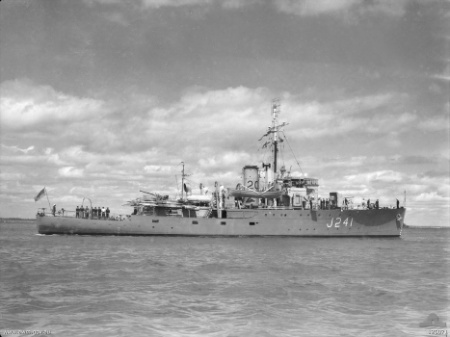
- HMAS Bunbury in February 1946

History

Australia
- Namesake: City of Bunbury, Western Australia
- Builder: Evans Deakin and Company
- Laid down: 1 November 1941
- Launched: 16 May 1942
- Commissioned: 3 January 1943
- Decommissioned: 26 August 1946
- Honours and awards: Pacific 1943–45; New Guinea 1943–44
- Fate: Sold for scrap in 1961
- Badge

General characteristics
- Class & type: Bathurst-class corvette
- Displacement: 650 tons (standard), 1,025 tons (full war load)
- Length: 186 ft (57 m)
- Beam: 31 ft (9.4 m)
- Draught: 8.5 ft (2.6 m)
- Propulsion: triple expansion engine, 2 shafts
- Speed: 15 knots (28 km/h; 17 mph) at 1,750 hp (1,300 kW)
- Complement: 85
- Armament: 1 × 4-inch Mk XIX gun; 3 × Oerlikon 20 mm cannons; Machine guns; Depth charges chutes and throwers

HMAS Bunbury (J241/M241), named for the city of Bunbury, Western Australia, was one of 60 Bathurst-class corvettes constructed during World War II, and one of 36 initially manned and commissioned solely by the Royal Australian Navy (RAN).

== Design and construction ==
In 1938, the Australian Commonwealth Naval Board (ACNB) identified the need for a general purpose 'local defence vessel' capable of both anti-submarine and mine-warfare duties, while easy to construct and operate. The vessel was initially envisaged as having a displacement of approximately 500 tons, a speed of at least 10 knots (19 km/h; 12 mph), and a range of 2,000 nautical miles (3,700 km; 2,300 mi) The opportunity to build a prototype in the place of a cancelled Bar-class boom defence vessel saw the proposed design increased to a 680-ton vessel, with a 15.5 knots (28.7 km/h; 17.8 mph) top speed, and a range of 2,850 nautical miles (5,280 km; 3,280 mi), armed with a 4-inch gun, equipped with asdic, and able to fitted with either depth charges or minesweeping equipment depending on the planned operations: although closer in size to a sloop than a local defence vessel, the resulting increased capabilities were accepted due to advantages over British-designed mine warfare and anti-submarine vessels. Construction of the prototype HMAS Kangaroo did not go ahead, but the plans were retained. The need for locally built 'all-rounder' vessels at the start of World War II saw the "Australian Minesweepers" (designated as such to hide their anti-submarine capability, but popularly referred to as "corvettes") approved in September 1939, with 60 constructed during the course of the war: 36 (including Bunbury) ordered by the RAN, 20 ordered by the British Admiralty but manned and commissioned as RAN vessels, and 4 for the Royal Indian Navy.

Bunbury was laid down by Evans Deakin and Company at Brisbane on 1 November 1941, launched on 16 May 1942 by Mrs. F. A. Cooper, wife of the Treasurer of Queensland, and commissioned on 3 January 1943.

== Operational history ==
=== 1943 ===
After commissioning, Bunbury was assigned to escort duties, first along the east coast of Australia amid increased attacks on supply ships by Japanese submarines and later between her Townsville base, Port Moresby and Milne Bay. Along with a number of other Bathurst-class ships, Bunbury participated in a ferry service transporting troops and supplies to Oro Bay in the aftermath of the battle of Buna–Gona in early 1943.

=== 1944 ===
Departing Melbourne in March 1944 following refit, Bunbury returned to New Guinea but was forced to return to Brisbane in April after running aground at Cape Cretin. Following repairs, the ship performed escort duties in the vicinity of Darwin and by September had proceeded to Fremantle for anti-submarine exercises. On 17 December 1944, Bunbury was involved in a collision with the submarine HMS Sea Rover while operating out of Fremantle, requiring further repairs lasting a month.

=== 1945 ===
After concluding exercises with American submarines off Fremantle, Bunbury again sailed for New Guinea on 17 April for her last wartime patrol. On 15 May, in company with the sloop HMAS Swan, Bunbury shelled Japanese targets at Wewak in support of Australian ground forces. During this patrol, she also performed Guard ship duties at Morotai and Biak, departing for Adelaide in July.

Following the Japanese surrender, Bunbury joined the 20th Minesweeping Flotilla in November, operating in South Australia and Tasmania until May 1946 when she left the flotilla and sailed for Sydney.

== Fate ==
Bunbury paid off to reserve on 26 August 1946 and was sold for scrap to the Kinoshita Company of Japan on 6 January 1961, along with HMAS Bundaberg. The corvette received two battle honours for her service during World War II; "Pacific 1943–45" and "New Guinea 1943–44". The ship's bell is displayed in her namesake city of Bunbury. Her battle honours were inherited by Fremantle-class patrol boat HMAS Bunbury (FCPB 217), which was commissioned into the RAN in 1984.
