= HMAS Whyalla (J153) =

Australian Navy Corvette (1941 - 1946)

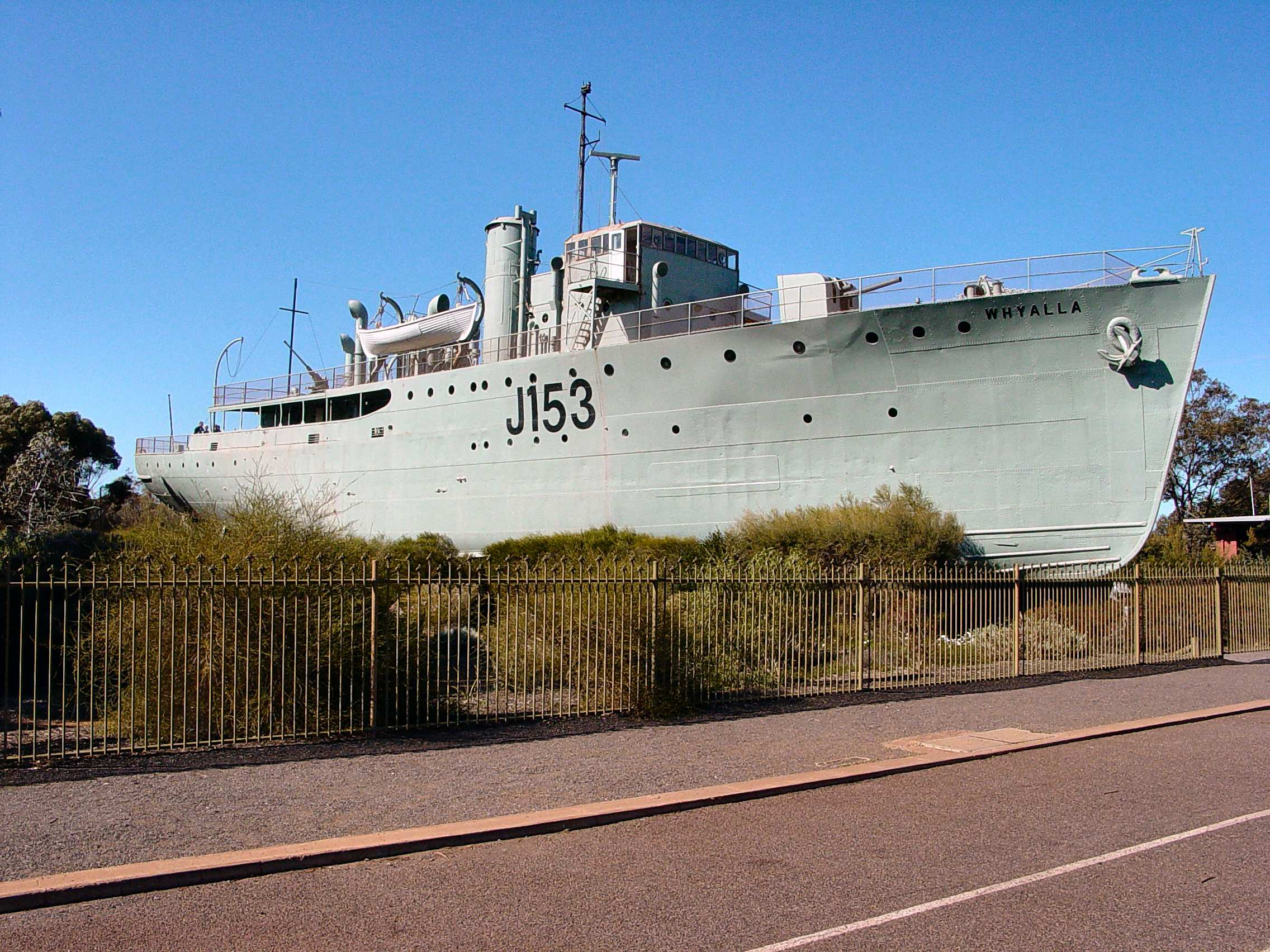
- HMAS Whyalla

History

Australia
- Namesake: City of Whyalla
- Builder: BHP, Whyalla
- Yard number: 8
- Laid down: 24 July 1940
- Launched: 12 May 1941
- Commissioned: 8 January 1942
- Decommissioned: 16 May 1946
- Honours and awards: Battle honours: Pacific 1942–45; New Guinea 1942–44; Okinawa 1945
- Fate: Sold into civilian service
- Badge

Victorian Public Works Department
- Name: Rip
- Acquired: 10 February 1947
- In service: 1947
- Out of service: 1984
- Reclassified: Lighthouse maintenance vessel
- Fate: Sold in 1984

Whyalla City Council
- Name: Whyalla
- Acquired: Late 1984
- Status: Landlocked museum ship; 33°01′10″S 137°34′30″E

General characteristics during RAN service
- Class & type: Bathurst-class corvette
- Displacement: 733 tons (standard)
- Length: 186 ft (57 m)
- Beam: 31 ft (9.4 m)
- Draught: 8.5 ft (2.6 m)
- Propulsion: Triple expansion engine, 2 shafts
- Speed: 15 knots (28 km/h; 17 mph) at 1,750 hp
- Complement: 85
- Armament: 1 × 4-inch Mk XIX gun; 3 × Oerlikon 20 mm cannons (1 later removed); 1 × Bofors 40 mm Automatic Gun L/60 (installed later); Machine guns; Depth charges chutes and throwers

HMAS Whyalla (J153/B252), named for the city of Whyalla was one of 60 Bathurst-class corvettes constructed during World War II and one of 20 built on Admiralty order but crewed by personnel of and later commissioned into the Royal Australian Navy (RAN). The ship was sold to the Victorian Public Works Department at the end of the war, who renamed her Rip and used her as a maintenance ship. In 1984, she was purchased by Whyalla City Council, who put her on display as a landlocked museum ship in 1987.

== Design and construction ==
In 1938, the Australian Commonwealth Naval Board (ACNB) identified the need for a general purpose 'local defence vessel' capable of both anti-submarine and mine-warfare duties, while easy to construct and operate. The vessel was initially envisaged as having a displacement of approximately 500 tons, a speed of at least 10 knots (19 km/h; 12 mph), and a range of 2,000 nautical miles (3,700 km; 2,300 mi) The opportunity to build a prototype in the place of a cancelled Bar-class boom defence vessel saw the proposed design increased to a 680-ton vessel, with a 15.5 knots (28.7 km/h; 17.8 mph) top speed, and a range of 2,850 nautical miles (5,280 km; 3,280 mi), armed with a 4-inch gun, equipped with asdic, and able to fitted with either depth charges or minesweeping equipment depending on the planned operations: although closer in size to a sloop than a local defence vessel, the resulting increased capabilities were accepted due to advantages over British-designed mine warfare and anti-submarine vessels. Construction of the prototype HMAS Kangaroo did not go ahead, but the plans were retained.

The need for locally built 'all-rounder' vessels at the start of World War II saw the "Australian Minesweepers" (designated as such to hide their anti-submarine capability, but popularly referred to as "corvettes") approved in September 1939, with 60 constructed during the course of the war: 36 ordered by the RAN, 20 (including Whyalla) ordered by the British Admiralty but crewed and commissioned as RAN vessels, and 4 for the Royal Indian Navy.

Whyalla was laid down by BHP at its Whyalla shipyard on 24 July 1940 as Yard Number 8. The corvette was launched on 12 May 1941 by Lady Barclay-Harvey, wife of the Governor of South Australia, and commissioned on 8 January 1942. Whyalla was the first ship built by the Whyalla shipyard. (Note: Yard Nos. 1–7 were cargo ships which were built later) The ship was originally to be named Glenelg, for the Adelaide suburb of Glenelg. That name was later used by another Bathurst-class vessel.

== Operational history ==
=== RAN ===
In 1942, the corvette worked supporting convoys off the south eastern Australian coast, and was in Sydney Harbour during the Japanese midget submarine attack of 31 May 1942. 12 days later, Whyalla was escorting a southbound convoy when the freighter Guatemala was torpedoed and sunk by Japanese submarine I-21, the only ship to be lost in a convoy escorted by Whyalla.

In December 1942, the corvette was assigned to New Guinea, where she performed convoy escort, hydrographic survey work, and was involved in the leadup to the Battle of Buna-Gona. On 2 January 1943, Whyalla and two small Australian survey ships, Stella and Polaris, were attacked by Japanese dive-bombers while in McLaren Harbour, Cape Nelson, New Guinea. The corvette received minor damage from near-misses, with two crew injured by shrapnel. The corvette continued survey work until relieved by sister ship Shepparton in April 1943. Whyalla proceeded to Milne Bay, and was present when the anchorage was attacked by a force of approximately 100 Japanese aircraft. Again, Whyalla was not seriously damaged, and the corvette assisted sister ships Kapunda and Wagga in the rescue and salvage effort.

Whyalla returned to Australia for refits in June 1943, and on completion was assigned to convoy duty off Australia's east coast, where she remained until February 1944. Between February and June, she was involved in anti-submarine patrols off Sandy Cape, then was again assigned to New Guinea. In December 1944, Whyalla was one of nine Australian Bathursts assigned to the British Pacific Fleet's 21st Minesweeping Flotilla. Whyalla spent the rest of the war performing minesweeping, escort, and anti-submarine duties with the British Pacific Fleet, as well as participating in the occupation of Okinawa from March to May 1944, and entering a short refit in June 1944. Following the conclusion of World War II, Whyalla spent a short time operating in Hong Kong before returning to Brisbane in October 1945. She was decommissioned on 16 May 1946.

The corvette received three battle honours for her wartime service: "Pacific 1942–45", "New Guinea 1942–44", and "Okinawa 1945".

=== Civilian service ===
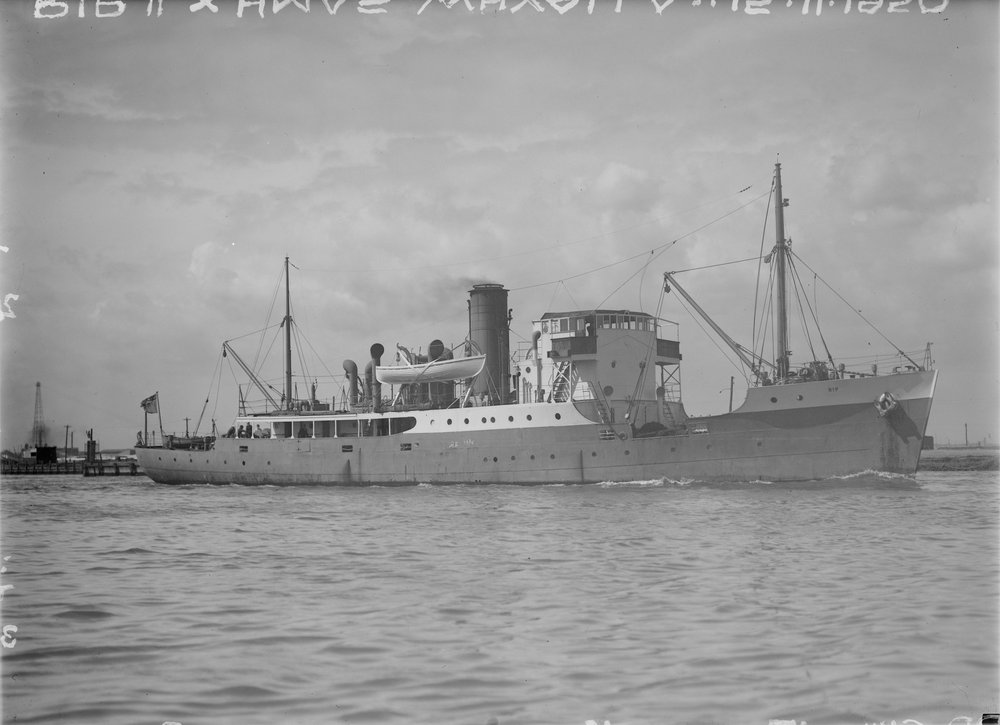
Lighthouse maintenance vessel Rip

Whyalla was sold to the Victorian Public Works Department on 10 February 1947. The corvette was modified for civilian service, renamed Rip, and towed to Melbourne, where she entered service as a lighthouse maintenance vessel at the entrance to Port Phillip Bay. The ship was in service until 1984, and was to be sold for scrap.

=== Maritime museum ===
When the Whyalla City Council learned that the corvette was to be scrapped, it negotiated to purchase the ship. Whyalla was purchased for $5,000 and sailed back to Whyalla with a volunteer crew of 11 and under her own steam in late 1984. The corvette was located in her launching slipway until April 1987, when she was moved 2 kilometres (1.2 mi) inland to become the centrepiece of the Whyalla Maritime Museum, which opened on 29 October 1988. Whyalla is one of only two Bathurst-class corvettes still in existence as museum ships; the other being HMAS Castlemaine.
