= HMAS Burnie =

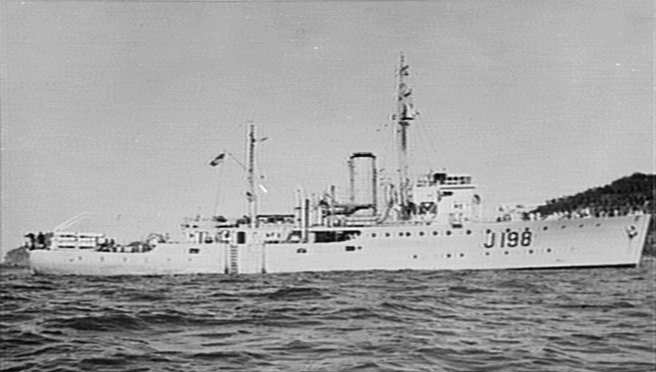
- HMAS Burnie

History

Australia
- Namesake: Burnie
- Builder: Mort's Dock & Engineering Company
- Laid down: 4 June 1940
- Launched: 25 October 1940
- Commissioned: 15 April 1941
- Decommissioned: 5 July 1946
- Honours and awards: Battle honours: Pacific 1942–45; Indian Ocean 1942–44; Okinawa 1945
- Fate: Transferred to RNLN

Netherlands
- Name: Ceram
- Acquired: 5 July 1946
- Commissioned: 5 July 1946
- Stricken: 1958

General characteristics
- Class & type: Bathurst-class corvette
- Displacement: 650 tons (standard), 1,025 tons (full war load)
- Length: 186 ft (57 m)
- Beam: 31 ft (9.4 m)
- Draught: 8.5 ft (2.6 m)
- Propulsion: Triple expansion, 2 shafts. 2,000 hp
- Speed: 15 knots (28 km/h; 17 mph) at 1,750 hp
- Complement: 85
- Armament: 1 × 4 inch Mk XIX gun, Depth charge chutes and throwers

HMAS Burnie (J198/B238/A112), named for the city of Burnie, Tasmania, was one of 60 Bathurst-class corvettes constructed during World War II and one of 20 built for the Admiralty but manned by personnel of and commissioned into the Royal Australian Navy (RAN).

Entering RAN service in April 1941, Burnie saw action during World War II, and was decommissioned on 5 July 1946. The corvette was sold to the Royal Netherlands Navy (RNLN) five days later, was renamed HNLMS Ceram, and remained in service until 1958.

== Design and construction ==
In 1938, the Australian Commonwealth Naval Board (ACNB) identified the need for a general purpose 'local defence vessel' capable of both anti-submarine and mine-warfare duties, while easy to construct and operate. The vessel was initially envisaged as having a displacement of approximately 500 tons, a speed of at least 10 knots (19 km/h; 12 mph), and a range of 2,000 nautical miles (3,700 km; 2,300 mi) The opportunity to build a prototype in the place of a cancelled Bar-class boom defence vessel saw the proposed design increased to a 680-ton vessel, with a 15.5 knots (28.7 km/h; 17.8 mph) top speed, and a range of 2,850 nautical miles (5,280 km; 3,280 mi), armed with a 4-inch gun, equipped with asdic, and able to be fitted with either depth charges or minesweeping equipment depending on the planned operations: although closer in size to a sloop than a local defence vessel, the resulting increased capabilities were accepted due to advantages over British-designed mine warfare and anti-submarine vessels. Construction of the prototype HMAS Kangaroo did not go ahead, but the plans were retained. The need for locally built 'all-rounder' vessels at the start of World War II saw the "Australian Minesweepers" (designated as such to hide their anti-submarine capability, but popularly referred to as "corvettes") approved in September 1939, with 60 constructed during the course of the war: 36 ordered by the RAN, 20 (including Burnie) ordered by the British Admiralty but manned and commissioned as RAN vessels, and 4 for the Royal Indian Navy.

Burnie was laid down by Mort's Dock & Engineering Company, Sydney on 4 June 1940. The corvette was launched on 25 October 1940 by Lady King, wife of the Mort's Dock Chairman of Directors, and was commissioned into the RAN on 15 April 1941.

== Operational history ==
=== Royal Australian Navy ===
==== Australia and Singapore ====
Burnie was initially assigned to the 20th Minesweeping Flotilla, which she joined on 10 May 1941. The ship was then temporarily based at Fremantle, Western Australia as a patrol ship and convoy escort, then was sent to Sydney. In June, Burnie and sister ship HMAS Goulburn were assigned to the Royal Navy's China Force, and sailed to Singapore via the east coast of Australia, arriving on 12 July. There Burnie with HMAS Goulburn, HMAS Bendigo and HMAS Maryborough composed the 21st Minesweeping Flotilla assigned to minesweeping, patrol and escort duties. Burnie was present in Singapore when Japan attacked Pearl Harbor and invaded Malaya.

==== Collapse of Java ====
The corvette was involved in a series of actions delaying the Japanese advance through Malaya and the Netherlands East Indies, including anti-submarine patrol, demolition work, troop and civilian evacuation, and anti-aircraft engagements, both individually and in concert with other Allied ships. During this time, she was involved in the evacuation of Sumatra in mid-February 1942, and, with Bendigo, rescued survivors from the Dutch vessel Boero (Note: Allied Merchant Ship Losses in the Pacific and Southeast Asia (7 December 1941 – 9 March 1942): Confiscated former French 7,135-ton freighter Dupleix sunk 25 February in the Indian Ocean south of Sunda Strait by torpedo from IJN submarine I-58. Ship spelling sometimes Boeroe, but Boero per Lloyd's and Gill.) on 28 February from the beach at Java Head. During the final days the ship was flagship for Commodore Collins commanding the China Force. This continued until September 1942, when Burnie was assigned to the British Eastern Fleet for anti-submarine patrol and convoy escort duties in the Indian Ocean.

Along with Goulburn the ship had left Singapore on 25 January assigned to sweep the southern half of Banka Strait arriving in Batavia 30 January and on finding the harbor congested were at Tanjung Priok by 2 February where Burnie and Goulburn began on 5 February a continuous anti-submarine patrol until the Japanese invasion of Java. By 12 February and a flood of ships fleeing the fall of Singapore and Japanese advances the ship was sent to Oosthaven in Sumatra for anti-submarine patrols at that port. On the 17th the ship entered the port with HNLMS Soemba to assist in demolition of facilities covering a bridge to the wharf with her gun while a shore party worked through the night destroying ammunition, rail equipment and placing depth charges under the KPM wharf and a cargo shed as well as pouring sulphuric acid into the working parts and destroying propellers of four trucks of torpedoes before Burnie got underway and completed destruction with gunfire.

On the morning of 19 February the ship arrived at Tanjung Priok where her commanding officer, Lieutenant Commander T. Christy, RANR(S), reported to Commodore Collins and received orders to take temporary command of HMAS Ballarat and, with a party of Royal Air Force personnel return in Ballarat to Oosthaven for salvage of air force material. With that mission accomplished Christy returned in Ballarat on 21 February, the date when the American-British-Dutch-Australian Command had cabled Winston Churchill that further efforts to hold Java and the purpose of the command itself were useless. Withdrawal from Java began and on 22 February Ballarat, Bendigo, Burnie and Maryborough replaced coal burning ships in the Sunda Strait Auxiliary Patrol established by Collins to prevent Japanese landings on Java from Sumatra with night crossings in small craft.

By the 27th all British ships were ordered withdrawn from the Sunda Strait area and all the ships of 21st Minesweeping Flotilla were short of fuel with the flotilla commander ordering withdrawal to Tjilatjap for fueling on 28 February but Bendigo and Burnie were detached to rescue a party seen signaling from Java Head. On reaching the site Bendigo picked up fifteen and Burnie twenty-nine people that were survivors of the Dutch ship Boero that had been torpedoed several days earlier. Meanwhile, the flotilla had been ordered to return to Sunda Strait but the two ships with survivors were ordered on to Tjilatjap.

On 1 March, with the two ships and survivors approaching Tjilatjap the withdrawal from Batavia was ordered and all British ships were to gather at Tjilatjap for evacuation. By the time the two corvettes arrived on the afternoon of 1 March Japanese forces were already south of the port and Bendigo broadcast a message from Commodore Collins that all ships with enough fuel to avoid that port should proceed directly to Fremantle or Colombo. During the evening Collins arrived from Batavia and boarded Burnie. Evacuees were loaded on all ships available in the port and at 8 p.m. on 2 March Burnie departed flying Collins' flag and reaching Fremantle on 8 March after narrowly escaping Admiral Kondō's cruisers that sunk HMS Stronghold, the first of the British ships that left Tjilatjap, HMAS Yarra, USS Pillsbury and USS Asheville.

==== Eastern Fleet ====
Burnie remained with the Eastern Fleet until December 1944, when she and the other Admiralty-controlled Australian corvettes were ordered to Sydney, formed up as a Minesweeping Flotilla, and attached to the British Pacific Fleet. The corvette was primarily used as a patrol ship and convoy escort in the waters of New Guinea, the Admiralty Islands, and the Philippines.

After World War II ended in August 1945, Burnie was ordered to Hong Kong, where she was involved in mine clearance operations. By November, she had returned to Australian waters, and during December 1945 and January 1946 was involved in several public relations activities, including a visit to her namesake town and a cruise for children in Port Phillip Bay. The corvette's wartime service was recognised with three battle honours: "Pacific 1942–45", "Indian Ocean 1942–44", and "Okinawa 1945".

=== Royal Netherlands Navy service ===
Following the end of World War II, all of the Admiralty-operated Bathurst class corvettes were earmarked for disposal. Burnie, along with sister ships Ipswich and Toowoomba, were slated for transfer to the Royal Netherlands Navy (RNLN). The three corvettes departed Brisbane on 4 June 1946, arriving in Ceylon a month and a day later. The three ships were paid off from RAN service and commissioned into the RNLN; Burnie being renamed HNLMS Ceram

Ceram remained in service with the RNLN until 1958, when she was removed from the active service list.
