= HMAS Parkes =

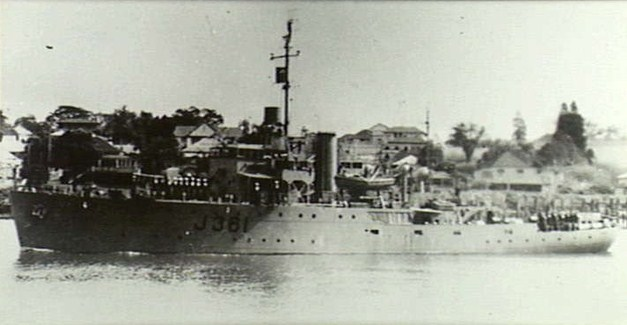
- HMAS Parkes

History

Australia
- Namesake: Town of Parkes, New South Wales
- Builder: Evans Deakin & Co in Brisbane
- Laid down: 16 March 1943
- Launched: 30 October 1943
- Commissioned: 25 May 1944
- Decommissioned: 17 December 1945
- Motto: "Equals with Equals"
- Honours and awards: Battle honours: Pacific 1944; New Guinea 1944
- Fate: Sold for scrap in 1957
- Badge

General characteristics
- Class & type: Bathurst-class corvette
- Displacement: 650 tons (standard), 1,025 tons (full war load)
- Length: 186 ft (57 m)
- Beam: 31 ft (9.4 m)
- Draught: 8.5 ft (2.6 m)
- Propulsion: triple expansion engine, 2 shafts, 2,000 horsepower
- Speed: 15 knots (28 km/h; 17 mph) at 1,750 hp
- Complement: 85
- Armament: 1 × 4 inch Mk XIX gun, 3 × Oerlikon 20 mm cannons, Machine guns, Depth charges chutes and throwers

HMAS Parkes (J361), named for the town of Parkes, New South Wales, was one of 60 Bathurst-class corvettes constructed in Australia during World War II, and one of 36 initially manned and commissioned by the Royal Australian Navy (RAN).

== Design and construction ==
In 1938, the Australian Commonwealth Naval Board (ACNB) identified the need for a general purpose 'local defence vessel' capable of both anti-submarine and mine-warfare duties, while easy to construct and operate. The vessel was initially envisaged as having a displacement of approximately 500 tons, a speed of at least 10 knots (19 km/h; 12 mph), and a range of 2,000 nautical miles (3,700 km; 2,300 mi) The opportunity to build a prototype in the place of a cancelled Bar-class boom defence vessel saw the proposed design increased to a 680-ton vessel, with a top speed of 15.5 knots (28.7 km/h; 17.8 mph), and a range of 2,850 nautical miles (5,280 km; 3,280 mi), armed with a 4-inch gun, equipped with asdic, and able to be fitted with either depth charges or minesweeping equipment depending on the planned operations: although closer in size to a sloop than a local defence vessel, the resulting increased capabilities were accepted due to advantages over British-designed mine warfare and anti-submarine vessels. Construction of the prototype HMAS Kangaroo did not go ahead, but the plans were retained. The need for locally built 'all-rounder' vessels at the start of World War II saw the "Australian Minesweepers" (designated as such to hide their anti-submarine capability, but popularly referred to as "corvettes") approved in September 1939, with 60 constructed during the course of the war: 36 (including Parkes) ordered by the RAN, 20 ordered by the British Admiralty but manned and commissioned as RAN vessels, and 4 for the Royal Indian Navy.

Parkes was laid down by Evans Deakin and Company at Brisbane on 16 March 1943. She was launched on 30 October 1943 by Mrs Brown, wife of the President of the Senate, and commissioned into the RAN on 25 May 1944. The ship was originally to be named Mudgee, for the town of Mudgee, New South Wales.

== Operational history ==
The corvette earned two battle honours for her wartimes service: "Pacific 1944" and "New Guinea 1944".

== Fate ==
Parkes paid off to reserve on 17 December 1945 in Fremantle, Western Australia. The vessel was sold for scrap to Hong Kong Rolling Mills Ltd on 2 May 1957.
