= HMAS Wagga =

Bathurst-class corvette

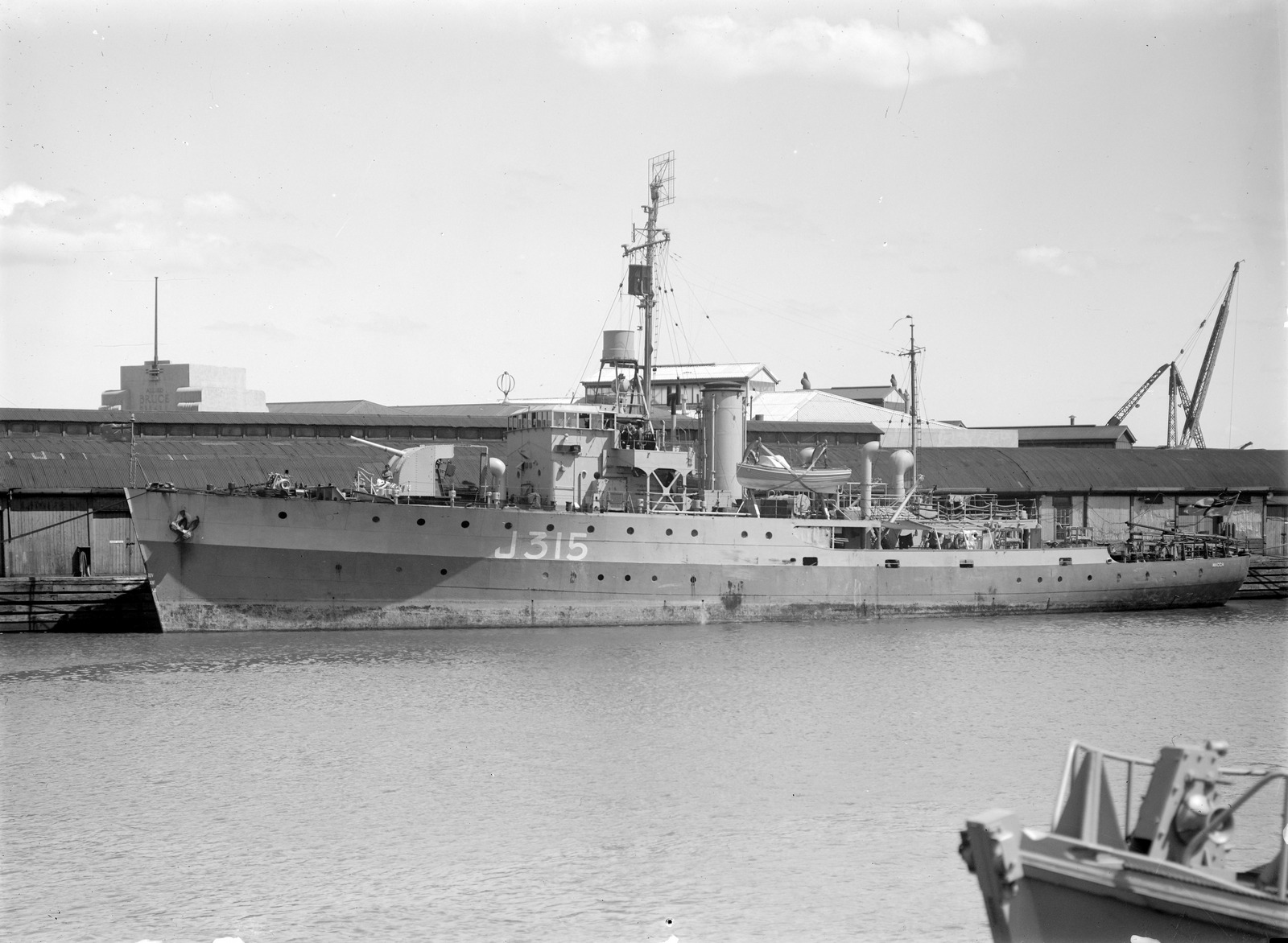
- HMAS Wagga

History

Australia
- Namesake: City of Wagga Wagga, New South Wales
- Builder: Morts Dock & Engineering Co in Sydney
- Laid down: 8 March 1942
- Launched: 25 July 1942
- Commissioned: 18 December 1942
- Decommissioned: 28 November 1945
- Recommissioned: 12 December 1951
- Decommissioned: 28 October 1960
- Reclassified: Training ship (12 December 1951)
- Motto: "Uppermost ever"
- Honours and awards: Battle honours: Pacific 1943–45; New Guinea 1943–44
- Fate: Sold for scrap in 1962
- Badge

General characteristics
- Class & type: Bathurst-class corvette
- Displacement: 815 tons (standard)
- Length: 189 ft (58 m)
- Beam: 32 ft (9.8 m)
- Draught: 8 ft 4 in (2.54 m)
- Propulsion: triple expansion engine, 2 shafts
- Speed: 15.5 knots (28.7 km/h; 17.8 mph)
- Complement: 85
- Armament: Original: 1 × 4 inch Mk XVI gun; 3 × Oerlikon 20 mm cannons; machine guns; depth charge chutes and throwers; Training ship: 1 × 4-inch gun; 1 × Bofors 40 mm L/60 gun

HMAS Wagga (J315), named after the city of Wagga Wagga, New South Wales was one of 60 Bathurst-class corvettes constructed during World War II, and one of 36 initially manned and commissioned solely by the Royal Australian Navy (RAN). During the war, the ship operated primarily in New Guinea waters. After war service, the corvette was placed in reserve, but she was recommissioned in 1951 as a training vessel, and was repeatedly moved into and out of reserve. Wagga was decommissioned in 1960, making her the last of the Australian-operated corvettes.

In the early 1960s she was moored at Hunters Hill and eventually sent to Japan as scrap.

== Design and construction ==
In 1938, the Australian Commonwealth Naval Board (ACNB) identified the need for a general purpose 'local defence vessel' capable of both anti-submarine and mine-warfare duties, while easy to construct and operate. The vessel was initially envisaged as having a displacement of approximately 500 tons, a speed of at least 10 knots (19 km/h; 12 mph), and a range of 2,000 nautical miles (3,700 km; 2,300 mi) The opportunity to build a prototype in the place of a cancelled Bar-class boom defence vessel saw the proposed design increased to a 680-ton vessel, with a 15.5 knots (28.7 km/h; 17.8 mph) top speed, and a range of 2,850 nautical miles (5,280 km; 3,280 mi), armed with a 4-inch gun, equipped with asdic, and able to fitted with either depth charges or minesweeping equipment depending on the planned operations: although closer in size to a sloop than a local defence vessel, the resulting increased capabilities were accepted due to advantages over British-designed mine warfare and anti-submarine vessels. Construction of the prototype HMAS Kangaroo did not go ahead, but the plans were retained. The need for locally built 'all-rounder' vessels at the start of World War II saw the "Australian Minesweepers" (designated as such to hide their anti-submarine capability, but popularly referred to as "corvettes") approved in September 1939, with 60 constructed during the course of the war: 36 (including Wagga) ordered by the RAN, 20 ordered by the British Admiralty but manned and commissioned as RAN vessels, and 4 for the Royal Indian Navy.

Wagga was laid down by Morts Dock & Engineering Co in Sydney, New South Wales on 8 March 1942. She was launched on 25 July 1942 by Mrs H. E. Gissing, the wife of the mayor of Wagga Wagga, and commissioned into the RAN on 18 December 1942.

== Operational history ==
=== World War II ===
Wagga entered service in January 1943, escorting convoys along the eastern Australian coast. Her area of operations extended into New Guinea in March, before the corvette operated in support of Operation Lilliput until June 1943. During the operation, on 14 April 1943, Wagga and several British and Dutch ships were attacked by over 100 Japanese aircraft. Wagga was not damaged, although several other ships were set on fire. Following Lilliput, she returned to convoy duties until the end of 1943.

Wagga visited Williamstown, Victoria for refits over December 1943 and January 1944, before spending the rest of the war operating in New Guinea. Wagga fulfilled many roles in this time; escorting convoys, performing anti-submarine patrols, transporting troops and supplies, and bombarding enemy land positions in support of Allied troops.

At the conclusion of World War II, Wagga sailed for Hong Kong, arriving on 29 August 1945. She remained there until October 1945, conducting mine sweeping and anti-piracy patrols. The corvette returned to Melbourne on 7 November, and was decommissioned into reserve on 28 November.

The corvette's wartime service was recognised with the battle honours "Pacific 1943–45" and "New Guinea 1943–44".

=== Training ship ===
The ship was reactivated and recommissioned as a training ship on 12 December 1951. As well as training reservists and National Service trainees, Wagga was called on to tow the cruiser HMAS Hobart to Newcastle in August 1952, perform patrols of New Guinea in 1954 and 1956, and assist in oceanographic surveys. Wagga underwent several refits and modernisations, and was decommissioned and recommissioned at least six times, on one occasion being in commission for only 11 days.

On 2 August 1956, the ship picked up the last of the four survivors of the sinking of the 'sixty-miler', Birchgrove Park.

== Fate ==
Wagga decommissioned for the final time on 28 October 1960, after travelling 190,000 nautical miles (350,000 km). She was the last of the Bathurst class to leave Australian service. The corvette was sold to the South Australia Carrying Company for scrapping in March 1962.

She was moored at a wharf in Hunters Hill until being sent to Japan for scrap

The White Ensign flown from Wagga was presented to the mayor of Wagga Wagga on 23 April 2011, during the final reunion for the ship's company. The flag is to be preserved and placed on display in the city's Civic Centre.
