= HMAS Horsham =

1942 Bathurst-class corvette

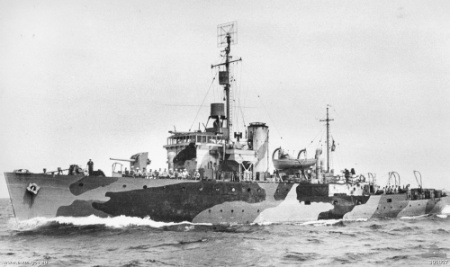
- HMAS Horsham

History

Australia
- Namesake: City of Horsham, Victoria
- Builder: HMA Naval Dockyard
- Laid down: 26 June 1941
- Launched: 16 May 1942
- Commissioned: 18 November 1942
- Decommissioned: 17 December 1945
- Fate: Sold for scrap in 1956
- Badge

General characteristics
- Class & type: Bathurst-class corvette
- Displacement: 650 tons (standard), 1,025 tons (full war load)
- Length: 186 ft (57 m)
- Beam: 31 ft (9.4 m)
- Draught: 8.5 ft (2.6 m)
- Propulsion: triple expansion engine, 2 shafts, 2,000 horsepower
- Speed: 15.5 knots (28.7 km/h; 17.8 mph)
- Complement: 85
- Armament: 1 × 4 inch Mk XIX gun; 1 × 12-pounder gun; 1 × 2-pounder gun; 1 twin 0.5-inch gun

HMAS Horsham (J235/M235), named for the city of Horsham, Victoria, was one of 60 Bathurst-class corvettes constructed during World War II, and one of 36 initially manned and commissioned solely by the Royal Australian Navy (RAN).

== Design and construction ==
In 1938, the Australian Commonwealth Naval Board (ACNB) identified the need for a general purpose 'local defence vessel' capable of both anti-submarine and mine-warfare duties, while easy to construct and operate. The vessel was initially envisaged as having a displacement of approximately 500 tons, a speed of at least 10 knots (19 km/h; 12 mph), and a range of 2,000 nautical miles (3,700 km; 2,300 mi) The opportunity to build a prototype in the place of a cancelled Bar-class boom defence vessel saw the proposed design increased to a 680-ton vessel, with a 15.5 knots (28.7 km/h; 17.8 mph) top speed, and a range of 2,850 nautical miles (5,280 km; 3,280 mi), armed with a 4-inch gun, equipped with asdic, and able to fitted with either depth charges or minesweeping equipment depending on the planned operations: although closer in size to a sloop than a local defence vessel, the resulting increased capabilities were accepted due to advantages over British-designed mine warfare and anti-submarine vessels. Construction of the prototype HMAS Kangaroo did not go ahead, but the plans were retained. The need for locally built 'all-rounder' vessels at the start of World War II saw the "Australian Minesweepers" (designated as such to hide their anti-submarine capability, but popularly referred to as "corvettes") approved in September 1939, with 60 constructed during the course of the war: 36 (including Horsham) ordered by the RAN, 20 ordered by the British Admiralty but manned and commissioned as RAN vessels, and 4 for the Royal Indian Navy.

Horsham was laid down by HMA Naval Dockyard at Melbourne, Victoria on 26 June 1941. She was launched on 16 May 1942, and was commissioned into the RAN on 18 November 1942.

== Operational history ==
Horsham entered active service in January 1943. She was initially assigned to Fremantle as an anti-submarine patrol ship, where she remained until August 1944. The corvette was then deployed to Darwin as a survey ship, and remained there until the end of World War II. In September 1945, Horsham was present at the Japanese surrender of Timor. She continued in the survey role until November 1945, when she returned to Fremantle.

== Decommissioning and fate ==
Horsham paid off into reserve in Fremantle on 17 December 1945. She was sold for scrapping to the Hong Kong Delta Shipping Company on 8 August 1956.
