= HMAS Cairns (J183) =

1941 Bathurst-class corvette

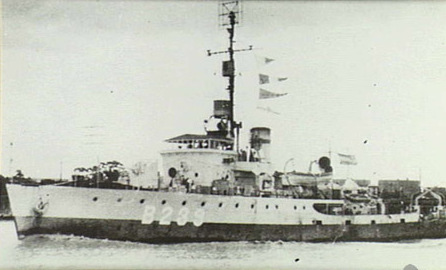
- HMAS Cairns

History

Australia
- Namesake: City of Cairns, Queensland
- Builder: Walkers Limited
- Laid down: 31 March 1941
- Launched: 7 October 1941
- Commissioned: 11 May 1942
- Decommissioned: 17 January 1946
- Honours and awards: Battle honours: Pacific 1942–45; Indian Ocean 1942–45; Sicily 1943; Okinawa 1945
- Fate: Transferred to RNLN
- Badge

Netherlands
- Name: Ambon
- Namesake: Ambon Island
- Commissioned: 17 January 1946
- Fate: Transferred to TNI-AL

Indonesia
- Name: Banteng
- Namesake: Javanese bull
- Commissioned: 6 April 1950
- Fate: Broken up for scrap in 1968

General characteristics
- Class & type: Bathurst-class corvette
- Displacement: 650 tons (standard), 1,025 tons (full war load)
- Length: 186 ft (57 m)
- Beam: 31 ft (9.4 m)
- Draught: 8.5 ft (2.6 m)
- Propulsion: triple expansion engine, 2 shafts. 2,000 hp
- Speed: 15 knots (28 km/h; 17 mph) at 1,750 hp
- Complement: 85
- Armament: 1 × 4 inch Mk XIX gun, 3 × Oerlikon 20 mm cannons (later 4), 1 × Bofors 40 mm L/60 gun (installed later), Machine guns, Depth charges chutes and throwers

HMAS Cairns (J183), named for the city of Cairns, Queensland, was one of 60 Bathurst-class corvettes constructed during World War II and one of 20 built for the British Admiralty, but manned by personnel of and commissioned into the Royal Australian Navy (RAN).

== Design and construction ==
In 1938, the Australian Commonwealth Naval Board (ACNB) identified the need for a general-purpose "local defence vessel" capable of both anti-submarine and mine-warfare duties, while easy to construct and operate. The vessel was initially envisaged as having a displacement of approximately 500 tons, a speed of at least 10 knots (19 km/h; 12 mph), and a range of 2,000 nautical miles (3,700 km; 2,300 mi) The opportunity to build a prototype in the place of a cancelled Bar-class boom defence vessel saw the proposed design increased to a 680-ton vessel, with a 15.5 knots (28.7 km/h; 17.8 mph) top speed, and a range of 2,850 nautical miles (5,280 km; 3,280 mi), armed with a 4-inch gun, equipped with ASDIC, and able to fitted with either depth charges or minesweeping equipment, depending on the planned operations. Although closer in size to a sloop than a local defence vessel, the resulting increased capabilities were accepted due to advantages over British-designed mine warfare and anti-submarine vessels. Construction of the prototype HMAS Kangaroo did not go ahead, but the plans were retained. The need for locally built "all-rounder" vessels at the start of World War II saw the "Australian Minesweepers" (designated as such to hide their anti-submarine capability, but popularly referred to as "corvettes") approved in September 1939, with 60 constructed during the course of the war: 36 ordered by the RAN, 20 (including Cairns) ordered by the British Admiralty, but manned and commissioned as RAN vessels, and four for the Royal Indian Navy.

Cairns was laid down by Walkers Limited at Maryborough, Queensland on 31 March 1941. She was launched on 7 October 1941 by Mrs. R. D. Walker, wife of the Works Manager of Walkers Limited, and commissioned into the RAN on 11 May 1942.

== Operational history ==
=== Royal Australian Navy ===
From entering service until 16 October 1942, Cairns was based in Fremantle and operated as a convoy escort, anti-submarine patroller, and minesweeper. On 16 October, the corvette was reassigned to the British Eastern Fleet and ordered to Kilindini, Kenya, arriving on 14 November.

Cairns remained with the Eastern Fleet until January 1945. Most of this time was spent on patrol or escort duties in the Indian Ocean. The corvette was reassigned to the Mediterranean from June until September 1943. During this time, Cairns was involved in the Allied invasion of Sicily. On 11 February 1944, a convoy Cairns was assigned to was attacked by Ro-110. The corvette was involved in the successful destruction of the submarine, but one convoy ship was torpedoed. Following a refit in Adelaide from May to July 1944, Cairns was redeployed to Colombo, which was her base of operations until January 1945, when the corvette was sent back to Australia.

On arrival in Australian waters, Cairns was assigned to the British Pacific Fleet.

The ship received four battle honours for her wartime service: "Pacific 1942–45", "Indian Ocean 1942–45", "Sicily 1943", and "Okinawa 1945".

=== Royal Netherlands Navy ===
Following the end of World War II, all Admiralty-owned Bathurst class corvettes were disposed of. Cairns was paid off in Brisbane on 17 January 1946. She was immediately recommissioned into the Royal Netherlands Navy (RNLN) and renamed HNLMS Ambon.

=== Indonesian Navy ===
Following four years of service with the RNLN, the ship was transferred to the Indonesian Navy on 6 April 1950 and renamed KRI Banteng.

== Fate ==
The corvette was broken up for scrap in April 1968.
