= HMAS Tamworth =

1942 Bathurst-class corvette

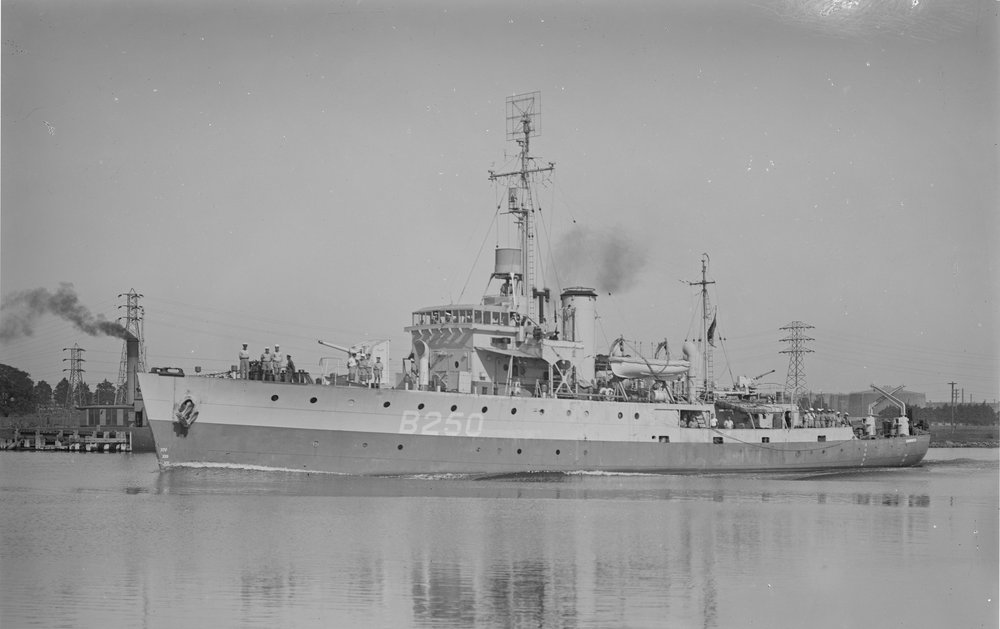
- HMAS Tamworth

History

Australia
- Namesake: City of Tamworth, New South Wales
- Builder: Walkers Limited in Maryborough, Queensland
- Laid down: 25 August 1941
- Launched: 14 March 1942
- Commissioned: 8 August 1942
- Decommissioned: 30 April 1946
- Honours and awards: Battle honours: Pacific 1942–45; Indian Ocean 1943–44
- Fate: Sold to RNLN
- Badge

Netherlands
- Name: Tidore
- Namesake: Tidore Island
- Commissioned: 30 April 1946
- Decommissioned: December 1949
- Fate: Sold to TNI-AL

Indonesia
- Name: Pati Unus
- Namesake: Pati Unus, Sultan of Demak
- Commissioned: December 1949
- Decommissioned: 1969
- Fate: Disposed of

General characteristics during Admiralty service
- Class & type: Bathurst-class corvette
- Displacement: 650 tons (standard), 1,025 tons (full war load)
- Length: 186 ft (57 m)
- Beam: 31 ft (9.4 m)
- Draught: 8.5 ft (2.6 m)
- Propulsion: triple expansion engine, 2 shafts
- Speed: 15 knots (28 km/h; 17 mph) at 1,750 hp
- Complement: 85
- Armament: 1 × 12-pounder gun (later replaced by 1 × 4 inch Mk XIX gun), 3 × Oerlikons (1 later removed), 1 × Bofors 40 mm L/60 gun (installed later), Machine guns, Depth charges chutes and throwers

HMAS Tamworth (J181/B250/A124), named for the city of Tamworth, New South Wales, was one of 60 Bathurst-class corvettes constructed during World War II and one of 20 built on Admiralty order but manned by personnel of and later commissioned into the Royal Australian Navy (RAN). Tamworth later saw service in the Royal Netherlands Navy (RNLN) and in the Indonesian Navy (TNI-AL).

== Design and construction ==
In 1938, the Australian Commonwealth Naval Board (ACNB) identified the need for a general purpose 'local defence vessel' capable of both anti-submarine and mine-warfare duties, while easy to construct and operate. The vessel was initially envisaged as having a displacement of approximately 500 tons, a speed of at least 10 knots (19 km/h; 12 mph), and a range of 2,000 nautical miles (3,700 km; 2,300 mi) The opportunity to build a prototype in the place of a cancelled Bar-class boom defence vessel saw the proposed design increased to a 680-ton vessel, with a 15.5 knots (28.7 km/h; 17.8 mph) top speed, and a range of 2,850 nautical miles (5,280 km; 3,280 mi), armed with a 4 inch Mk XIX gun, equipped with asdic, and able to fitted with either depth charges or minesweeping equipment depending on the planned operations: although closer in size to a sloop than a local defence vessel, the resulting increased capabilities were accepted due to advantages over British-designed mine warfare and anti-submarine vessels. Construction of the prototype HMAS Kangaroo did not go ahead, but the plans were retained. The need for locally built 'all-rounder' vessels at the start of World War II saw the "Australian Minesweepers" (designated as such to hide their anti-submarine capability, but popularly referred to as "corvettes") approved in September 1939, with 60 constructed during the course of the war: 36 ordered by the RAN, 20 (including Tamworth) ordered by the British Admiralty but manned and commissioned as RAN vessels, and 4 for the Royal Indian Navy.

Tamworth was laid down by Walkers Limited at Maryborough, Queensland on 25 August 1941. She was launched on 14 March 1942 by Mrs. A. M. Horsburgh, the wife of one of the shipyard's directors, and commissioned on 8 August 1942.

== Operational history ==
From February 1943 until January 1945, Tamworth was assigned to the British Eastern Fleet. Following this, she was deployed with the British Pacific Fleet. Tamworth returned to Australian operational control on 28 September 1945. Tamworth earned two battle honours for her wartime service, "Pacific 1942–45" and "Indian Ocean 1943–44".

After a brief period of service as a training vessel in Australian waters was transferred to the Royal Netherlands Navy on 30 April 1946. In RNLN service, the ship operated under the name HNLMS Tidore, and served until December 1949.

Following this, the ship was transferred to the Indonesian Navy, renamed RI Pati Unus, and served until disposal in 1969.
