= 20th Minesweeping Flotilla (Australia) =

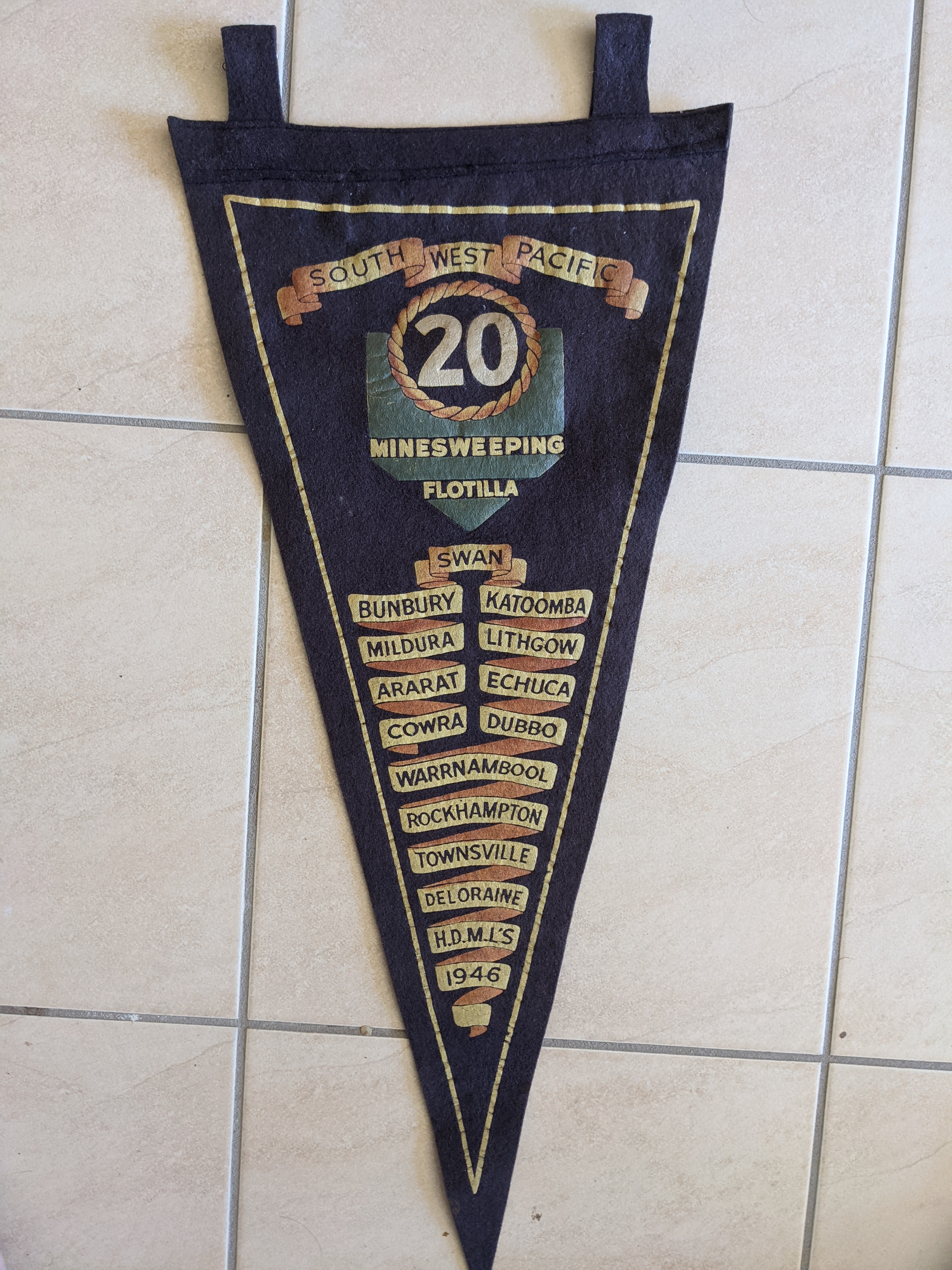
Pennant of the 20th Minesweeping Flotilla

The 20th Minesweeping Flotilla was a Royal Australian Navy minesweeping flotilla that operated during the Second World War. Formed on 9 December 1939 and styled in the naming convention for minesweeping flotilla names used by the Royal Navy, the flotilla consisted of HMAS Swan, Yarra, Doomba and Orara. The makeup of the flotilla changed during the course of the war.

After World War Two, it operated in a peacetime counter-mine mission up and down the Queensland from 1 July 1947 to 31 May 1950, removing leftover mines.

== Ships of the flotilla ==
- HMAS Swan
- HMAS Yarra
- HMAS Doomba
- HMAS Orara
- HMAS Warrego
- HMAS Warrnambool
- HMAS Echuca
- HMAS Burnie
- HMAS Mildura
- HMAS Bunbury
- HMAS Katoomba
- HMAS Lithgow
- HMAS Ararat
- HMAS Cowra
- HMAS Dubbo
- HMAS Rockhampton
- HMAS Townsville
- HMAS Deloraine
