= HMAS Ararat (K34) =

Bathurst-class corvette

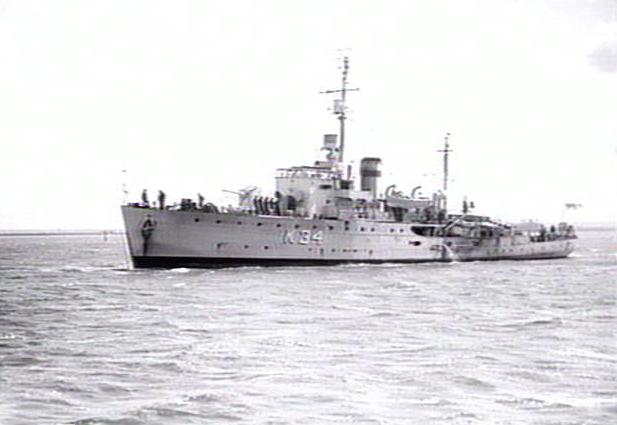
- HMAS Ararat

History

Australia
- Namesake: Town of Ararat, Victoria
- Builder: Evans Deakin & Co in Brisbane
- Laid down: 6 July 1942
- Launched: 20 February 1943
- Commissioned: 16 June 1943
- Decommissioned: 11 April 1947
- Honours and awards: Battle honours: Pacific 1943–45; New Guinea 1943–44
- Fate: Sold into civilian service 6 January 1961. Later scrapped.
- Badge

General characteristics
- Class & type: Bathurst-class corvette
- Displacement: 650 tons (standard), 1,025 tons (full war load)
- Length: 186 ft (57 m)
- Beam: 31 ft (9.4 m)
- Draught: 8.5 ft (2.6 m)
- Propulsion: triple expansion engine, 2 shafts, 2,000 horsepower
- Speed: 15 knots (28 km/h; 17 mph) at 1,750 hp
- Complement: 85
- Armament: 1 × 4 inch Mk XIX gun; 3 × Oerlikon 20 mm cannons; Machine guns; Depth charges chutes and throwers

HMAS Ararat (K34/M34), named for the city of Ararat, Victoria, was one of 60 Bathurst-class corvettes constructed during World War II, and one of 36 initially manned and commissioned solely by the Royal Australian Navy (RAN).

Ararat is the only ship of the Bathurst class to carry a pennant number with the flag superior 'K': to honour Flower-class corvette lead ship HMS Gladiolus, which was sunk in October 1941.^{(I)}

== Design and construction ==
In 1938, the Australian Commonwealth Naval Board (ACNB) identified the need for a general purpose 'local defence vessel' capable of both anti-submarine and mine-warfare duties, while easy to construct and operate. The vessel was initially envisaged as having a displacement of approximately 500 tons, a speed of at least 10 knots (19 km/h; 12 mph), and a range of 2,000 nautical miles (3,700 km; 2,300 mi) The opportunity to build a prototype in the place of a cancelled Bar-class boom defence vessel saw the proposed design increased to a 680-ton vessel, with a 15.5 knots (28.7 km/h; 17.8 mph) top speed, and a range of 2,850 nautical miles (5,280 km; 3,280 mi), armed with a 4-inch gun, equipped with asdic, and able to fitted with either depth charges or minesweeping equipment depending on the planned operations: although closer in size to a sloop than a local defence vessel, the resulting increased capabilities were accepted due to advantages over British-designed mine warfare and anti-submarine vessels. Construction of the prototype HMAS Kangaroo did not go ahead, but the plans were retained. The need for locally built 'all-rounder' vessels at the start of World War II saw the "Australian Minesweepers" (designated as such to hide their anti-submarine capability, but popularly referred to as "corvettes") approved in September 1939, with 60 constructed during the course of the war: 36 (including Ararat) ordered by the RAN, 20 ordered by the British Admiralty but manned and commissioned as RAN vessels, and 4 for the Royal Indian Navy.

Ararat was laid down by Evans Deakin & Co in Brisbane on 6 July 1942. She was launched on 20 February 1943 by the wife of Arthur Fadden, then leader of the Australian Country Party and the Federal Opposition, and commissioned on 16 June 1943.

== Operational history ==
Ararat entered active service in August 1943 escorting convoys firstly along the east coast of Australia, and later between Queensland and New Guinea. She continued in this role until March 1944, when she was transferred to Langemak, New Guinea for two months, performing escort and patrol duties in the waters of New Guinea and New Britain. During this time, she was the first ship of her class to visit several recently recaptured areas in New Britain.

The corvette was under refit in Melbourne from May until July 1944, and on completion returned to New Guinea. She was transferred to United States Naval command on 11 August 1944, and was used to patrol the forward areas of the Allied offensive. During this time, Ararat was involved in the transportation of survivors from sister ship HMAS Geelong following her collision with United States tanker York on 19 October. Ararat left US command at the end of 1944, and spent the early part of 1945 operating in the Morotai area. She briefly visited Townsville in March 1945, and in June, the corvette was deployed to Borneo to support Australian troops. Ararat returned to Australia on 22 July for refits, and was in dock when the war ended. The corvette's wartime service was recognised by the battle honours "Pacific 1943–45" and "New Guinea 1943–44".

Ararat was assigned to the 20th Minesweeping Flotilla on 22 October 1945, and was involved in clearing mines laid during the war; first in Australian waters, then around New Britain, New Ireland, and the Solomon Islands. This assignment was completed in November 1946, and on 11 April 1947 was decommissioned into reserve.

Ararat remained in reserve until 6 January 1961, when she was sold to Burns Philip & Co Ltd of Darwin. She was later sold on to the Fujita Salvage Company of Japan, who used her to perform salvage operations in Darwin Harbour. Ararat left Darwin for Japan on 20 July 1961, towing a crane. After arriving in Japan, she was broken up for scrap.

== Footnotes ==
1. ^(I) Although the source states that Gladiolus was a ship of the Royal Canadian Navy, the only ship of that name and pennant served with the Royal Navy.
