= Royal Australian Navy minesweeping after World War II =

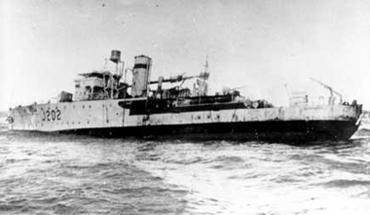
- HMAS Warrnambool sinking after striking a mine on 13 September 1947
- Location: Waters off Australia, New Guinea and the Solomon Islands
- Objective: Minesweeping around Australia and New Guinea
- Date: December 1945 – August 1948
- Executed by: Royal Australian Navy
- Outcome: 1,816 mines cleared
- Casualties: Four killed, 25 wounded

Following World War II the Royal Australian Navy (RAN) was required to clear naval mines from the waters around Australia and New Guinea. Minesweeping in these areas began in December 1945 and was completed in August 1948. One ship, the Bathurst-class corvette HMAS Warrnambool, was sunk during these operations.

== History ==
During World War II both the Allies and Japanese laid mines in Australian and New Guinean waters. The RAN's minelayer, HMAS Bungaree, laid almost 10,000 mines in Australian waters alone, and further mines were laid around Australian ports. Following the war Australia was legally responsible for clearing mines from its territorial waters as part of an international minesweeping effort coordinated by the Mine Clearance Board in London.

The RAN's 20th Minesweeping Flotilla was assigned the task of sweeping Australian waters for mines. The flotilla was based at Cairns, Queensland and was commanded from the sloop HMAS Swan. Clearance operations began in December 1945, and were generally conducted by Bathurst-class corvettes. Ships involved included HMAS Swan, Ararat, Cowra, Deloraine, Echuca, Katoomba, Lithgow, Mildura and Warrnambool as well as harbour defence motor launches 1323, 1328, 1329 and general purpose vessels 960 and 963. Over 1,200 sailors were involved in the operation.

Minesweeping was arduous and dangerous and the sailors involved were granted danger money of 6d per day. On 13 September 1947 Warrnambool struck a mine off North Queensland which had been laid by Bungaree in November 1943 and sank shortly afterwards with four sailors killed and another 25 wounded. Warrnambool is the only RAN warship to have ever been sunk by a mine.

The 20th Minesweeping Flotilla completed its task in August 1948. By this time 1,816 mines had been swept. Eleven officers and sailors were recommended for honours and awards for their role in the operation, with all recommendations being fully endorsed by Vice Admiral John Collins, the First Naval Member, Australian Commonwealth Naval Board. Some of the awards were delayed and others never granted, however, due to disagreements between the RAN and the Government over whether post-war minesweeping constituted 'operational' service.

== See also ==
- Clearance Diving Branch (RAN)
