= HMAS Mildura =

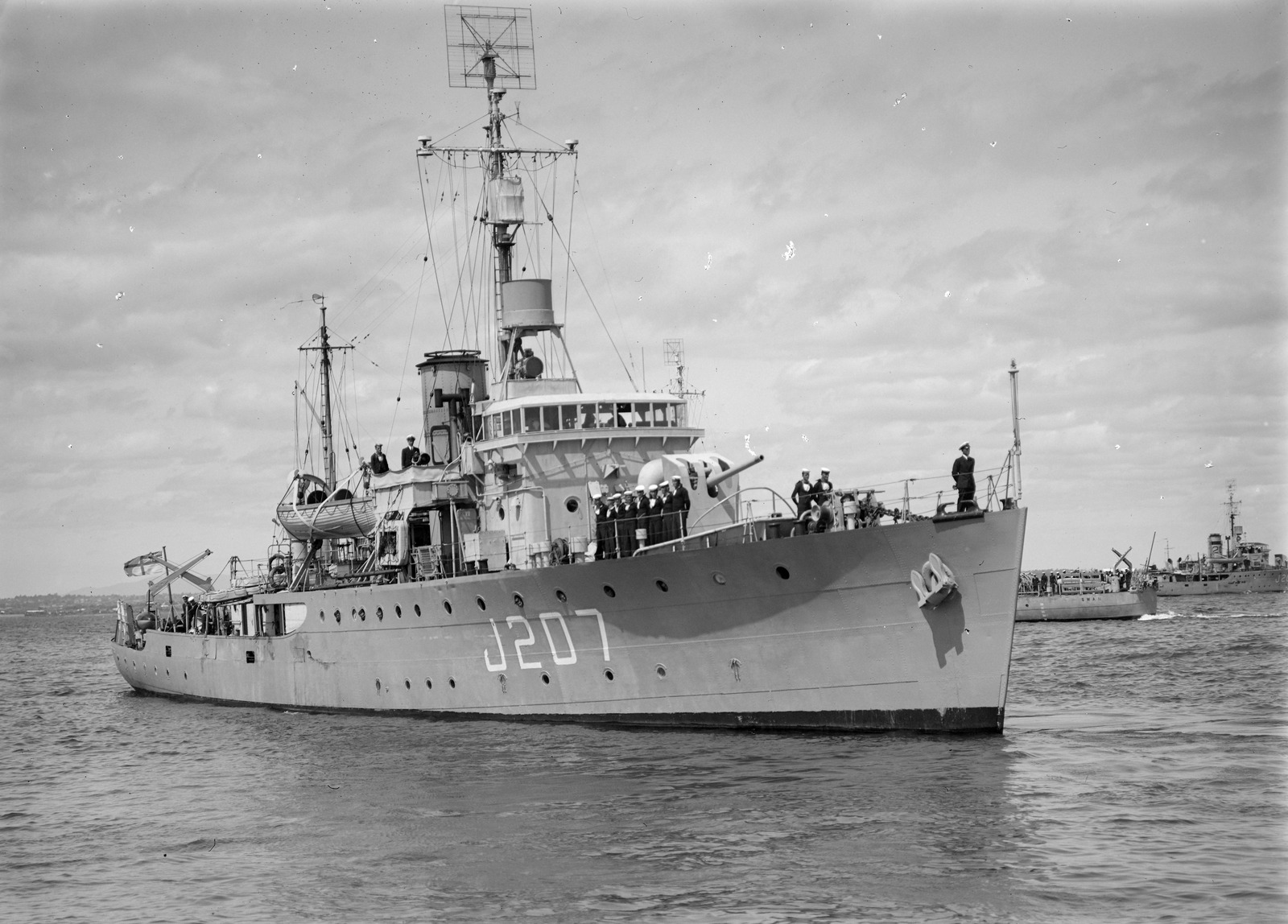
- HMAS Mildura

History

Australia
- Namesake: City of Mildura, Victoria
- Builder: Morts Dock & Engineering Co in Sydney
- Laid down: 23 September 1940
- Launched: 15 March 1941
- Commissioned: 23 July 1941
- Decommissioned: 21 May 1948
- Recommissioned: 20 February 1951
- Decommissioned: 11 September 1953
- Reclassified: Training ship (1951–1953); Immobilised training hulk (1954–1965)
- Motto: "Look Ahead"
- Honours and awards: Battle honours: Pacific 1941–45; New Guinea 1943–44
- Fate: Sold for scrap in 1965
- Badge

General characteristics
- Class & type: Bathurst-class corvette
- Displacement: 650 tons (standard), 1,025 tons (full war load)
- Length: 186 ft (57 m)
- Beam: 31 ft (9.4 m)
- Draught: 8 ft 6 in (2.59 m)
- Propulsion: 1 × triple expansion engine, 1,750 horsepower (1,300 kW), 2 shafts
- Speed: 15 knots (28 km/h; 17 mph)
- Complement: 85
- Armament: 1 × QF 4-inch (102 mm) Mk XIX HA gun; 3 × 20 mm Oerlikon cannons (later 2); 1 × Bofors 40 mm L/60 gun (installed later); Machine guns; Depth charges chutes and throwers

HMAS Mildura (J207/M207), named for the city of Mildura, Victoria, was one of 60 Bathurst-class corvettes constructed during World War II, and one of 36 initially manned and commissioned by the Royal Australian Navy (RAN). The ship was laid down by Morts Dock & Engineering Co in 1940 and commissioned into the RAN in 1941.

Mildura's initial deployments were on the east coast of Australia as a convoy escort and anti-submarine patrol vessel. At the start of 1944, she escorted vessels between Townsville, Queensland and New Guinea. Late 1944 saw the ship relocated to Fremantle, Western Australia as a local patrol ship. After a refit at the start of 1945, Mildura was based at Morotai, and operated throughout the Dutch East Indies until August, when the corvette was sent to clear Hong Kong waters of mines. During September and October, the mine warfare area increased to include Chinese waters. In late October, Mildura returned to Sydney for refitting, then spent the next two years clearing mines around Australia, New Guinea, and the Solomon Islands.

The corvette was paid off in 1948, but was recommissioned in 1951 to serve as a training vessel for National Service trainees. Mildura was decommissioned again in 1953, then was towed to Brisbane for use as a training hulk for local reservists. The ship was sold for scrap in 1965.

== Design and construction ==
In 1938, the Australian Commonwealth Naval Board (ACNB) identified the need for a general purpose 'local defence vessel' capable of both anti-submarine and mine-warfare duties, while easy to construct and operate. The vessel was initially envisaged as having a displacement of approximately 500 tons, a speed of at least 10 knots (19 km/h; 12 mph), and a range of 2,000 nautical miles (3,700 km; 2,300 mi) The opportunity to build a prototype in the place of a cancelled Bar-class boom defence vessel saw the proposed design increased to a 680-ton vessel, with a 15.5 knots (28.7 km/h; 17.8 mph) top speed, and a range of 2,850 nautical miles (5,280 km; 3,280 mi), armed with a 4-inch gun, equipped with asdic, and able to be fitted with either depth charges or minesweeping equipment depending on the planned operations: although closer in size to a sloop than a local defence vessel, the resulting increased capabilities were accepted due to advantages over British-designed mine warfare and anti-submarine vessels. Construction of the prototype HMAS Kangaroo did not go ahead, but the plans were retained. The need for locally built 'all-rounder' vessels at the start of World War II saw the "Australian Minesweepers" (designated as such to hide their anti-submarine capability, but popularly referred to as "corvettes") approved in September 1939, with 60 constructed during the course of the war: 36 (including Mildura) ordered by the RAN, 20 ordered by the British Admiralty but manned and commissioned as RAN vessels, and 4 for the Royal Indian Navy.

As constructed, Mildura displaced 650 tons, with a length of 186 feet (57 m), a beam of 31 feet (9.4 m), and a draught of 8 feet 6 inches (2.59 m). the propulsion system consisted of a single triple expansion steam engine, which supplied 1,750 horsepower (1,300 kW) to two propeller shafts. Maximum speed was 15 knots (28 km/h; 17 mph). Main armament for the corvette consisted of one 4-inch high-angle gun, supplemented by three 20 mm Oerlikon cannons (one of which was later replaced by a 40 mm Bofors gun), plus machine guns. Depth charge chutes and throwers were also fitted. The ship's company consisted of 85 personnel.

Mildura was laid down by Morts Dock & Engineering Co in Sydney on 23 September 1940. She was launched on 15 March 1941 by the wife of Commodore John Walter Durnford, the Second Naval Member of the Australian Commonwealth Naval Board, and commissioned on 23 July 1941.

== Operational history ==
Mildura was initially assigned to the 20th Minesweeping Flotilla until its disbandment in late 1941. The ship then operated independently on minesweeping, convoy escort, and anti-submarine patrols throughout Australian and South Pacific waters. In September 1942, Mildura was reassigned as a dedicated escort vessel for merchant convoys on the eastern Australian coast. In January 1943, the corvette recovered and towed the American merchant ship SS Peter H. Burnett after the latter was torpedoed off Sydney. On 8 February, SS Iron Knight was torpedoed while part of a convoy escorted by Mildura. In January 1944, Mildura was reassigned to patrol duties in Queensland waters, with regular detachments to escort convoys between Townsville and New Guinea. This continued until August 1944, when the corvette was relocated to Western Australia and assigned to patrols of the vicinity around Fremantle.

At the start of 1945, Mildura was refitted, then in March assigned to Morotai. The ship's main roles were to patrol the vicinity of the island, and to shepherd convoys between Morotai and Biak. On 22 June, the ship was sent to Borneo to provide nighttime patrols of Tarakan Harbour's approaches. She was reassigned back to Morotai at the end of June. During the return voyage, the ship diverted after spotting a crashed PBY Catalina on Makheli Island. A group of natives reported that the aircrew had been rescued by another aircraft, but requested that they themselves be evacuated because they had come to the attention of the Japanese. The six natives were transported to Morotai.

After spending July based in Morotai, followed by two weeks as guardship at Balikpapan, Mildura met seven other Bathurst-class corvettes at Subic Bay, then proceeded as a group to sweep Hong Kong waters of mines from 30 August. Other duties the corvette was involved in during the Japanese surrender of Hong Kong included patrols, the pursuit and seizure of small craft, and overseeing the transfer of the Hong Kong brewery from Japanese to Allied hands. In mid-September, the Hong Kong minesweeping force was rolled into the 21st Minesweeping Flotilla, which was tasked with clearing Chinese waters of mines. This continued until 17 October, and on 20 October, Mildura departed Hong Kong for Sydney. She arrived on 19 November and was docked for refit until February 1946. Mildura joined the 20th Minesweeping Flotilla in clearing mines around Australia, New Guinea, and the Solomon Islands until October 1947. The corvette received two battle honours for her wartime service: "Pacific 1941–45" and "New Guinea 1943–44".

Mildura was paid off to reserve at Fremantle, Western Australia on 21 May 1948 but was recommissioned on 20 February 1951 for use as a training ship for National Service trainees. She continued in this role until 1953.

== Decommissioning and fate ==
Mildura paid off again at Melbourne on 11 September 1953. The ship was towed to Brisbane by HMAS Sprightly in December, and on arrival was designated as a training hulk for reservists. The ship was sold for scrap to Brisbane Non-Ferrous on 8 September 1965.
