= HMAS Gympie =

Bathurst-class corvette

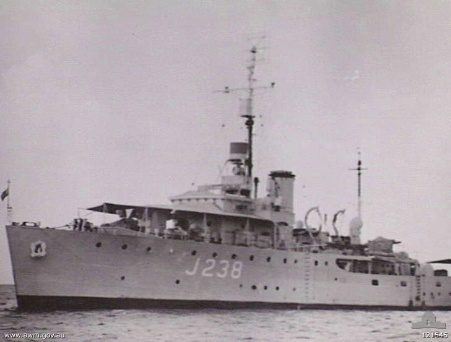
- HMAS Gympie in November 1945. An awning has been fitted over the ship's bow.

History

Australia
- Namesake: City of Gympie, Queensland
- Builder: Evans Deakin & Co
- Laid down: 27 August 1941
- Launched: 30 January 1942
- Commissioned: 4 November 1942
- Decommissioned: 23 May 1946
- Honours and awards: Battle honours; Pacific 1943–45; New Guinea 1943–44
- Fate: Sold for scrap in 1961
- Badge

General characteristics
- Class & type: Bathurst-class corvette
- Displacement: 650 tons (standard), 1,025 tons (full war load)
- Length: 186 ft (57 m)
- Beam: 31 ft (9.4 m)
- Draught: 8.5 ft (2.6 m)
- Propulsion: triple expansion engine, 2 shafts, 2,000 horsepower
- Speed: 15 knots (28 km/h; 17 mph) at 1,750 hp
- Complement: 85
- Armament: 1 × 12-pounder gun (replaced by 1 × 4 inch Mk XIX HA gun); 3 × Oerlikon 20 mm cannons (later reduced to 2); 1 × 40 mm (installed later); Machine guns; Depth charges chutes and throwers

HMAS Gympie (J238/M238), named for the city of Gympie, Queensland, was one of 60 Bathurst-class corvettes constructed during World War II, and one of 36 initially manned and commissioned solely by the Royal Australian Navy (RAN).

== Design and construction ==
In 1938, the Australian Commonwealth Naval Board (ACNB) identified the need for a general purpose 'local defence vessel' capable of both anti-submarine and mine-warfare duties, while easy to construct and operate. The vessel was initially envisaged as having a displacement of approximately 500 tons, a speed of at least 10 knots (19 km/h; 12 mph), and a range of 2,000 nautical miles (3,700 km; 2,300 mi) The opportunity to build a prototype in the place of a cancelled Bar-class boom defence vessel saw the proposed design increased to a 680-ton vessel, with a 15.5 knots (28.7 km/h; 17.8 mph) top speed, and a range of 2,850 nautical miles (5,280 km; 3,280 mi), armed with a 4-inch gun, equipped with asdic, and able to fitted with either depth charges or minesweeping equipment depending on the planned operations: although closer in size to a sloop than a local defence vessel, the resulting increased capabilities were accepted due to advantages over British-designed mine warfare and anti-submarine vessels. Construction of the prototype HMAS Kangaroo did not go ahead, but the plans were retained. The need for locally built 'all-rounder' vessels at the start of World War II saw the "Australian Minesweepers" (designated as such to hide their anti-submarine capability, but popularly referred to as "corvettes") approved in September 1939, with 60 constructed during the course of the war: 36 (including Gympie) ordered by the RAN, 20 ordered by the British Admiralty but manned and commissioned as RAN vessels, and 4 for the Royal Indian Navy.

Gympie was laid down by Evans Deakin & Co at Brisbane, Queensland on 27 August 1941. She was launched on 30 January 1942 by Mrs Deakin, wife of the managing director, and commissioned into the RAN in Brisbane on 4 November 1942.

== Operational history ==
From November 1942 to February 1944, Gympie escorted convoys off Australia's east coast. While none of the convoys under her protection were attacked, she came to the aid of the torpedoed US ship Peter H. Burnett in January 1943. Following a refit Gympie was deployed to New Guinean waters in February 1944, where she was used for escort and anti-submarine patrol duties. She returned to Australia in February 1945 for a refit and was returned to New Guinea in July 1945.

Following the end of World War II, Gympie participated in surrender ceremonies at Dili on 24 September and Kupang on 3 October, after which she performed survey work in the area. In November, the corvette collided with the merchant vessel SS Tullahoma, and returned to Brisbane for minor repairs.

The ship received two battle honours for her wartime service: "Pacific 1943–45" and "New Guinea 1943–44".

The crew adopted a mascot, a kitten born in 1943 and named Tiddles.

== Decommissioning and fate ==
Gympie was decommissioned into reserve in Brisbane on 23 May 1946. In early November 1947, she was towed to Sydney by sister ship Lithgow.

Gympie was sold for scrapping on 6 January 1961 to Kinoshita (Australia) Pty Ltd.
