= HMAS Ballarat (J184) =

1940 Bathurst-class corvette

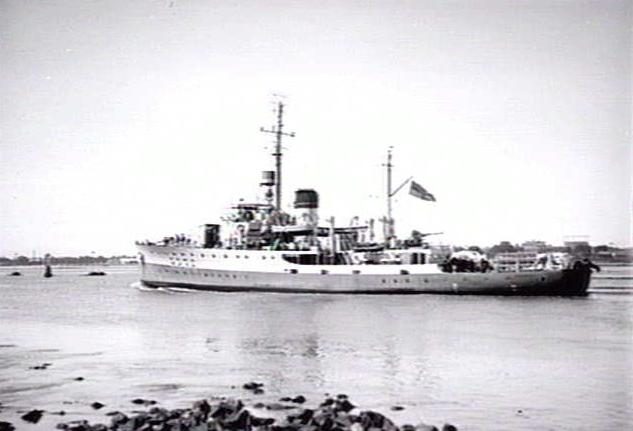
- HMAS Ballarat

History

Australia
- Namesake: City of Ballarat, Victoria
- Builder: HMA Naval Dockyard in Williamstown, Victoria
- Laid down: 19 April 1940
- Launched: 10 December 1940
- Commissioned: 30 August 1941
- Decommissioned: 27 September 1946
- Motto: "Defend the Flag"
- Honours and awards: Battle honours: Pacific 1941–45; New Guinea 1942–44; Okinawa 1945
- Fate: Sold into civilian service in 1947. Sold for scrap in 1953.
- Badge

General characteristics
- Class & type: Bathurst-class corvette
- Displacement: 650 tons (standard), 1,025 tons (full war load)
- Length: 186 ft (57 m)
- Beam: 31 ft (9.4 m)
- Draught: 8.5 ft (2.6 m)
- Propulsion: triple expansion engine, 2 shafts, 1,750 horsepower
- Speed: 15 knots (28 km/h; 17 mph)
- Complement: 85
- Armament: 1 × 4 inch Mk XIX gun; 3 × Oerlikon 20 mm cannons (later 2); 1 × Bofors 40 mm L/60 guns (installed later); Machine guns; Depth charges chutes and throwers

HMAS Ballarat (J184), named for the city of Ballarat, Victoria, was one of 60 Bathurst-class corvettes constructed during World War II and one of 20 built for the Admiralty but manned by personnel of and commissioned into the Royal Australian Navy (RAN).

== Design and construction ==
In 1938, the Australian Commonwealth Naval Board (ACNB) identified the need for a general purpose 'local defence vessel' capable of both anti-submarine and mine-warfare duties, while easy to construct and operate. The vessel was initially envisaged as having a displacement of approximately 500 tons, a speed of at least 10 knots (19 km/h; 12 mph), and a range of 2,000 nautical miles (3,700 km; 2,300 mi) The opportunity to build a prototype in the place of a cancelled Bar-class boom defence vessel saw the proposed design increased to a 680-ton vessel, with a 15.5 knots (28.7 km/h; 17.8 mph) top speed, and a range of 2,850 nautical miles (5,280 km; 3,280 mi), armed with a 4-inch gun, equipped with asdic, and able to be fitted with either depth charges or minesweeping equipment depending on the planned operations: although closer in size to a sloop than a local defence vessel, the resulting increased capabilities were accepted due to advantages over British-designed mine warfare and anti-submarine vessels. Construction of the prototype HMAS Kangaroo did not go ahead, but the plans were retained. The need for locally built 'all-rounder' vessels at the start of World War II saw the "Australian Minesweepers" (designated as such to hide their anti-submarine capability, but popularly referred to as "corvettes") approved in September 1939, with 60 constructed during the course of the war: 36 ordered by the RAN, 20 (including Ballarat) ordered by the British Admiralty but manned and commissioned as RAN vessels, and 4 for the Royal Indian Navy.

Ballarat was laid down by HMA Naval Dockyard in Williamstown, Victoria, on 19 April 1940. She was launched on 10 December 1940 by the wife of Albert Dunstan, then Premier of Victoria, and commissioned into the RAN on 30 August 1941.

== Operational history ==
Ballarat entered service on 20 September 1941, and on her arrival in Sydney three days later was immediately assigned to the 20th Minesweeping Flotilla. On 1 November, she was given the duty of providing anti-submarine protection to converted ocean liner Queen Mary, prior to her departure as part of a troop convoy to the Middle East. Ballarat departed for Darwin on 14 November, towing an oil lighter. On her arrival on 8 December, the corvette began escort patrols between Darwin and Timor. She headed to Singapore in early 1942, then was assigned to Banka Strait, where she was employed in rescue and demolitions work. On 14 February, Ballarat carried out one of the largest rescue operations in the region, collecting 215 survivors from the torpedoed merchant vessel MV Derrymore. Amongst the survivors was John Gorton, who would later become Prime Minister of Australia. Ballarat was also involved in the evacuation of Sumatra, and was the last RAN ship to leave.

On the conclusion of this assignment, the corvette returned to Australian waters and resumed convoy operation between Australia and New Guinea. In November 1942, Ballarat and sister ship Katoomba were attacked by Japanese dive bombers. In December 1942, Ballarat and sister ships Broome and Colac were involved in the deployment of troops to Buna; Ballarat performing four troop deployments over the month.

The corvette was ordered to the east coast of Australia in April 1943, to counter the increasing Japanese submarine threat. She remained in this role until January 1944, when she returned to Darwin to perform patrols to Thursday Island. Ballarat was again used as a troop transport in August 1944, moving soldiers from the Eilanden River in Papua New Guinea to Merauke, Indonesia. In 1945 she returned to Sydney to perform minesweeping operations prior to the arrival of the British Pacific Fleet, and then participated in the invasion of Okinawa.

Ballarat was present in Tokyo Bay on Victory over Japan Day (2 September 1945), when the Japanese Instrument of Surrender was signed. She was then deployed on minesweeping duties in the Hong Kong area, during which she struck a mine on 6 November 1945. She returned to Melbourne on 13 December, and was decommissioned into reserve on 27 September 1946. Ballarat's wartime service was recognised by three battle honours: "Pacific 1941–45", "New Guinea 1942–44", and "Okinawa 1945".

Ballarat was sold on 10 July 1947 to China Traders Ltd of Hong Kong, who then sold her on to the Ta Hing Company (Hong Kong) Ltd in December 1950. Refitted as a coastal trader and renamed Carmencita, the corvette never entered civilian service as a Statutory Order issued by the Australian Government prevented the ship from entering Chinese waters. Instead, she was sold a third time to John Manners and Co (Aust) Pty Ltd in 1953, who broke the ship up for scrap in the same year.
