= HMAS Katoomba =

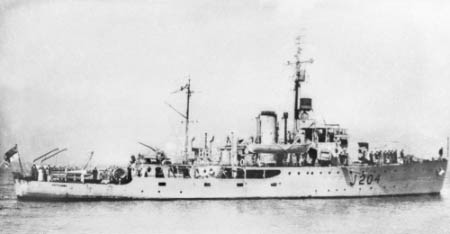

History

Australia
- Namesake: Town of Katoomba, New South Wales
- Builder: Poole & Steel
- Laid down: 9 September 1940
- Launched: 16 April 1941
- Commissioned: 17 December 1941
- Decommissioned: 2 August 1948
- Honours and awards: Battle honours: Darwin 1942; Pacific 1942–45; New Guinea 1942–44
- Fate: Sold for scrap
- Badge

General characteristics
- Class & type: Bathurst-class corvette
- Displacement: 650 tons (standard), 1,025 tons (full war load)
- Length: 186 ft (57 m)
- Beam: 31 ft (9.4 m)
- Draught: 8.5 ft (2.6 m)
- Propulsion: triple expansion engine, 2 shafts
- Speed: 15 knots (28 km/h; 17 mph) at 1,750 hp
- Complement: 85
- Armament: 1 × 12-pounder gun, 3 × Oerlikon 20 mm cannons (1 later replaced with 1 × Bofors 40 mm Automatic Gun L/60), Machine guns, Depth charges chutes and throwers

HMAS Katoomba (J204/M204), named after the tourist resort of Katoomba, New South Wales, was one of 60 Bathurst-class corvettes constructed during World War II, and one of 36 initially crewed and commissioned solely by the Royal Australian Navy (RAN).

== Design and construction ==
In 1938, the Australian Commonwealth Naval Board (ACNB) identified the need for a general purpose 'local defence vessel' capable of both anti-submarine and mine-warfare duties, while easy to construct and operate. The vessel was initially envisaged as having a displacement of approximately 500 tons, a speed of at least 10 knots (19 km/h; 12 mph), and a range of 2,000 nautical miles (3,700 km; 2,300 mi). The opportunity to build a prototype in the place of a cancelled Bar-class boom defence vessel saw the proposed design increased to a 680-ton vessel, with a 15.5 knots (28.7 km/h; 17.8 mph) top speed, and a range of 2,850 nautical miles (5,280 km; 3,280 mi), armed with a 4-inch gun, equipped with asdic, and able to fitted with either depth charges or minesweeping equipment depending on the planned operations: although closer in size to a sloop than a local defence vessel, the resulting increased capabilities were accepted due to advantages over British-designed mine warfare and anti-submarine vessels. Construction of the prototype HMAS Kangaroo did not go ahead, but the plans were retained. The need for locally built 'all-rounder' vessels at the start of World War II saw the "Australian Minesweepers" (designated as such to hide their anti-submarine capability, but popularly referred to as "corvettes") approved in September 1939, with 60 constructed during the course of the war: 36 (including Katoomba) ordered by the RAN, 20 ordered by the British Admiralty but crewed and commissioned as RAN vessels, and 4 for the Royal Indian Navy.

Katoomba was laid down by Poole & Steel at Balmain, New South Wales on 9 September 1940. She was launched on 16 April 1941 by Mrs. Lloyd, then deputy mayoress of Katoomba, and was commissioned into the RAN on 17 December 1941.

== Operational history ==
Katoomba entered active service with an assignment to Darwin, where she arrived on 19 December 1941. The next day, Katoomba, along with sister ships Deloraine and Lithgow, and the United States destroyer Edsall, was involved in the prosecution and successful sinking of Japanese submarine I-124, the first enemy submarine sunk in Australian waters. Katoomba was present during the Japanese bombing of Darwin on 19 February, but was not significantly damaged.

At the end of June, Katoomba was reassigned as a convoy escort and anti-submarine patrol ship in the waters of northern Queensland and New Guinea. On 14 August, Katoomba was sent to assist United States submarine S-39, which had run aground on a reef off Rossel Island. Attempts to refloat the submarine were unsuccessful, and on 16 August, the corvette left Rossel Island with S-39’s entire crew of 47 embarked. The submarine was gutted and left to break up naturally. On 28 November, Katoomba and sister ship Ballarat were attacked by a force of ten Japanese dive bombers. The corvettes escaped without serious damage. Katoomba was attacked again during January 1943, when a force of six Japanese aircraft attacked the corvette and the Dutch merchant ship Van Heutz. Katoomba escaped serious damage, but the merchantman was hit, with one man killed and three injured.

In February 1944, Katoomba ended her escort duties, and after a short period on patrol, was sent to Sydney for refitting. Upon her return to New Guinea waters in early May 1944, the corvette was assigned as an anti-submarine patrol ship. She remained in this role until the start of March 1945, although during this period she was occasionally used as an escort ship. The corvette returned to Australian waters, spent three months in Fremantle, then was assigned to Darwin, where she operated until the end of World War II.

After the war's end, Katoomba was sent to the Japanese surrender at Timor, before assignment to mine-clearance duties throughout New Guinea waters. She returned to Sydney in October 1946, and was prepared for decommissioning, but was instead reactivated to help clear the coast of Queensland of mines.

Katoomba received three battle honours for her wartime service: "Darwin 1942", "Pacific 1942–45", and "New Guinea 1942–44".

== Decommissioning and fate ==
Katoomba arrived in Fremantle on 16 January 1948, and was paid off into reserve on 2 August. She remained in reserve until 2 May 1957, when she was sold for breaking up as scrap to the Hong Kong Rolling Mills.
