= HMAS Warrnambool (J202) =

1941 Bathurst-class corvette

Coordinates: 14°45′32″S 145°49′41″E

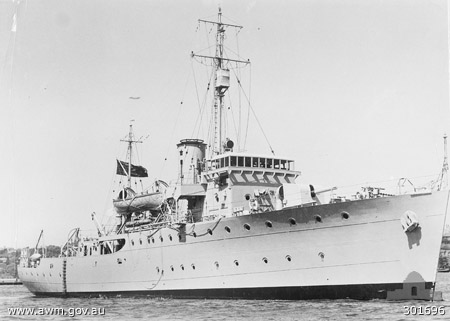
- HMAS Warrnambool in 1941 before being commissioned.

History

Australia
- Namesake: City of Warrnambool, Victoria
- Builder: Morts Dock & Engineering Co in Sydney
- Laid down: 13 November 1940
- Launched: 8 May 1941
- Commissioned: 23 September 1941
- Motto: "By These We Flourish"
- Honours and awards: Battle honours: Darwin 1942; Pacific 1942–45; New Guinea 1942
- Fate: Sunk during mine clearance on 13 September 1947
- Badge

General characteristics
- Class & type: Bathurst-class corvette
- Displacement: 650 tons (standard), 1,025 tons (full war load)
- Length: 186 ft (57 m)
- Beam: 31 ft (9.4 m)
- Draught: 8.5 ft (2.6 m)
- Propulsion: triple expansion engine, 2 shafts
- Speed: 15 knots (28 km/h; 17 mph) at 1,750 hp
- Complement: 85
- Armament: 1 × 4 inch Mk XIX gun; 1 × 40 mm Bofors AA gun (installed later); 3 × 20 mm Oerlikon guns (1 later removed); machine guns; depth charge chutes and throwers

HMAS Warrnambool (J202), named for the city of Warrnambool, Victoria was one of 60 Bathurst-class corvettes constructed during World War II, and one of 36 initially crewed and commissioned solely by the Royal Australian Navy (RAN). Warrnambool sank after she hit a mine in the Great Barrier Reef on 13 September 1947. She was one of only four Bathurst class corvettes lost while in Australian service, and the only one lost after World War II.

== Design and construction ==
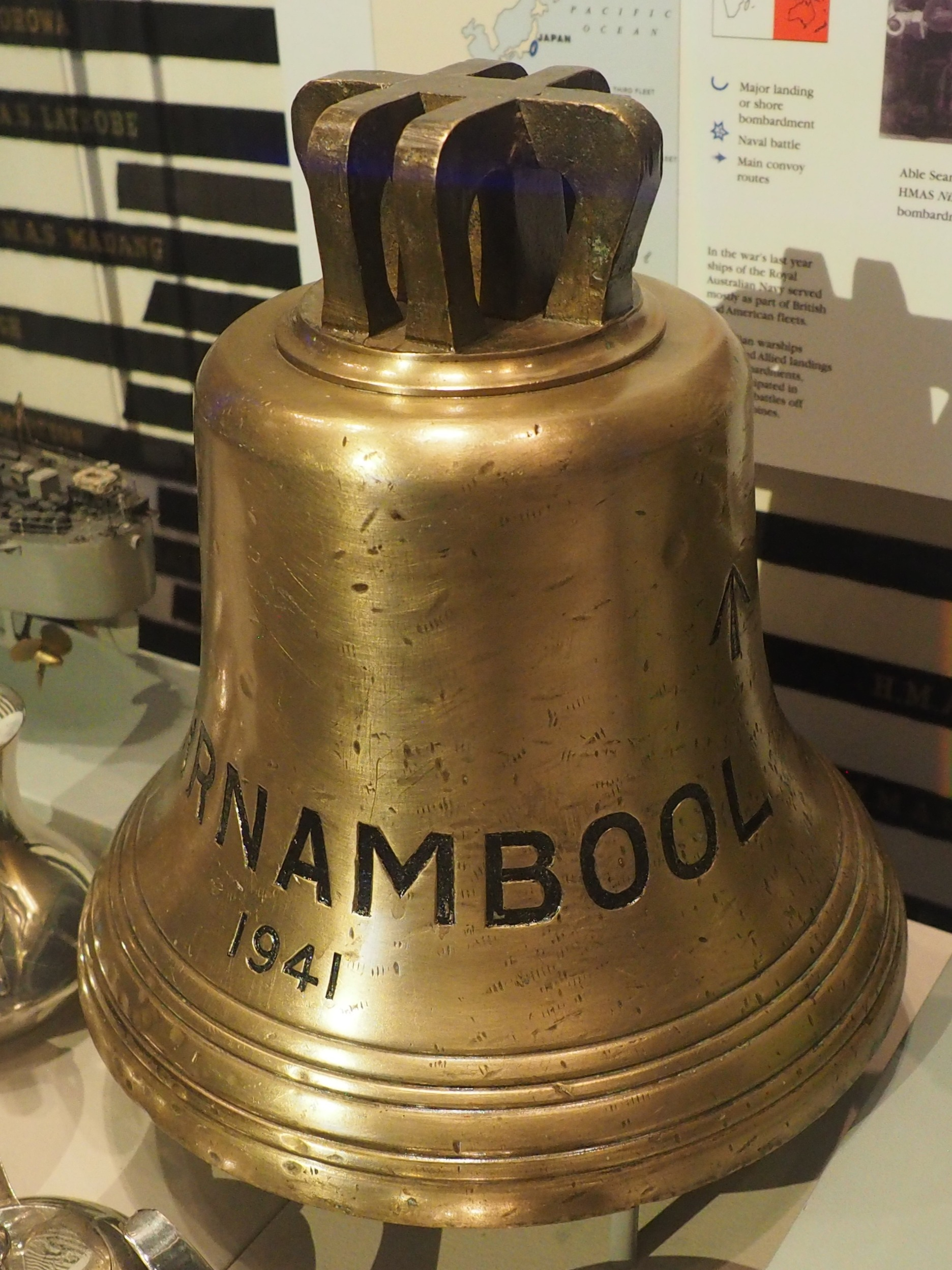
HMAS Warrnambool's ship's bell on display at the Australian War Memorial in 2026

In 1938, the Australian Commonwealth Naval Board (ACNB) identified the need for a general purpose 'local defence vessel' capable of both anti-submarine and mine-warfare duties, while easy to construct and operate. The vessel was initially envisaged as having a displacement of approximately 500 tons, a speed of at least 10 knots (19 km/h; 12 mph), and a range of 2,000 nautical miles (3,700 km; 2,300 mi) The opportunity to build a prototype in the place of a cancelled Bar-class boom defence vessel saw the proposed design increased to a 680-ton vessel, with a 15.5 knots (28.7 km/h; 17.8 mph) top speed, and a range of 2,850 nautical miles (5,280 km; 3,280 mi), armed with a 4-inch gun, equipped with asdic, and able to fitted with either depth charges or minesweeping equipment depending on the planned operations: although closer in size to a sloop than a local defence vessel, the resulting increased capabilities were accepted due to advantages over British-designed mine warfare and anti-submarine vessels. Construction of the prototype HMAS Kangaroo did not go ahead, but the plans were retained. The need for locally built 'all-rounder' vessels at the start of World War II saw the "Australian Minesweepers" (designated as such to hide their anti-submarine capability, but popularly referred to as "corvettes") approved in September 1939, with 60 constructed during the course of the war: 36 (including Warrnambool) ordered by the RAN, 20 ordered by the British Admiralty but crewed and commissioned as RAN vessels, and 4 for the Royal Indian Navy.

Morts Dock & Engineering Co laid Warrnambool down in Sydney on 13 November 1940. She was launched on 8 May 1941 by Mrs Simpson, wife of a shipyard Director, and commissioned on 23 September 1941.

== Operational history ==
Warrnambool began her career with patrols of Bass Strait, before heading to northern waters. She was in Darwin during the bombing of Darwin on 19 February 1942, although she was not damaged. A day later she was involved in the rescue of 73 crew from the Filipino merchant vessel MV Don Isidro, following attacks by Japanese dive bombers. During the rescue, the Japanese attacked Warrnambool but she received only minor damage. Over the next 12 months Warrnambool was involved in five evacuations or rescues (including that of HMAS Voyager’s crew following the destroyer running aground in September 1942), present for eighteen Japanese air raids, and transported over 4,000 troops to New Guinea.

In late 1942, the corvette moved to the east coast of Australia, where she remained until September 1944, performing convoy escort and anti-submarine patrols. Following this Warrnambool was assigned to Fremantle, Western Australia, where she performed similar duties until February 1945, when she returned to Darwin. She was present at the Japanese surrender at Koepang, Timor, on 11 September 1945.

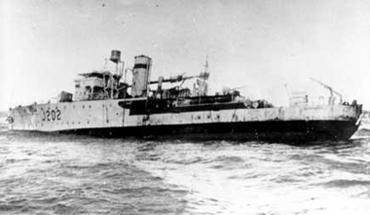
HMAS Warrnambool sinking after striking a mine on 13 September 1947, near Cockburn Reef, Queensland.

Following the conclusion of World War II, Warrnambool performed mine clearance work in the Solomon and New Guinea Islands before moving to the Great Barrier Reef. While performing clearance work on 13 September 1947, the corvette hit a mine around 16:00 near Cockburn Reef, off the northern Queensland coast. Four sailors were killed and another 29 were injured. Warrnambool sank shortly afterward, in 25 metres (82 ft) of water. The wreck was sold to Southern Cross Diving and Salvage on 3 July 1972. A Board of Inquiry found that there was no culpable negligence in the loss of the corvette, and praised the conduct of her crew and commanding officer. Warrnambool is the only RAN ship to be sunk by a mine. A survey conducted in 2016 by HMAS Mermaid found that the wreck of Warrnambool remained largely intact.

The corvette's wartime service was recognised with three battle honours: "Darwin 1942", "Pacific 1942–45", and "New Guinea 1942".
