= HMAS Bunbury =

Two ships of the Royal Australian Navy (RAN) have been named HMAS Bunbury, for the port city of Bunbury, Western Australia.

- HMAS Bunbury (J241), a Bathurst-class corvette launched in 1942 and decommissioned in 1946
- HMAS Bunbury (FCPB 217), a Fremantle-class patrol boat which entered service in 1983 and left service in 2005

== Battle honours ==
Two battle honours have been awarded to ships named HMAS Bunbury:

- Pacific 1943–45
- New Guinea 1943–44
