= HMAS Swan (U74) =

Sloop-of-war

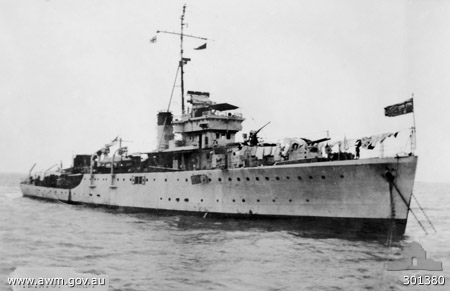
- HMAS Swan in 1945

History

Australia
- Namesake: Swan River
- Builder: Cockatoo Island Dockyard
- Laid down: 1 May 1935
- Launched: 28 March 1936
- Commissioned: 21 January 1937
- Decommissioned: 20 September 1962
- Reclassified: Training ship (1956–1962)
- Motto: "Forward"
- Honours and awards: Battle honours: Darwin 1942; Pacific 1941–45; New Guinea 1943–44; Plus one inherited battle honour
- Fate: Sold for scrap

General characteristics
- Class & type: Grimsby-class sloop
- Displacement: 1,060 tons (standard), 1,500 tons (full load)
- Length: 266 ft 3 in (81.15 m)
- Beam: 36 ft (11 m)
- Draught: 7.5 to 10 ft (2.3 to 3.0 m)
- Propulsion: 2 × Admiralty 3-drum boilers, Parsons turbines, 2,000 shp (1,500 kW), 2 shafts
- Speed: 16.5 knots (30.6 km/h; 19.0 mph)
- Complement: 135 peace, 160 war
- Armament: Initial: 3 × QF 4-inch (101.6 mm) Mk V anti-aircraft guns; 1 × quadruple Vickers .50 machine gun; From 1942: 4 × QF 4 inch Mk XVI guns in 2 twin mounts; 1 × Bofors 40 mm gun; 6 × Oerlikon 20 mm cannons; Depth Charge throwers

HMAS Swan (U74/F74/A427), named for the Swan River, was a Grimsby-class sloop of the Royal Australian Navy (RAN) that served during World War II.

== Design and construction ==
The Grimsby class consisted of thirteen sloops, four of which were built in Australia for the RAN. Swan, one of the first pair constructed, had a displacement of 1,060 tons at standard load and 1,500 tons at full load, was 266 feet 3 inches (81.15 m) long, had a beam of 36 feet (11 m), and a draught of between 7.5 and 10 feet (2.3 and 3.0 m) depending on load. Propulsion machinery consisted of two Admiralty 3-drum boilers connected to Parsons geared turbines, which delivered 2,000 shaft horsepower (1,500 kW) to the sloop's two propeller shafts. Maximum speed was 16.5 knots (30.6 km/h; 19.0 mph). The ship's company in peacetime consisted of 135 officers and sailors; this increased to 160 during the war.

Swan's initial armament consisted of three QF 4-inch (101.6 mm) Mark V anti-aircraft guns and a quadruple .50 in anti-aircraft machine gun mount for close-in defence. From 1942, this was increased to four QF 4 inch Mk XVI guns in 2 twin mounts, with a close-in armament of a Bofors 40 mm gun and six Oerlikon 20 mm cannon. The ship's depth charge load had increased to 40 by the end of the war.

Swan was laid down by Cockatoo Island Dockyard at Sydney, New South Wales on 1 May 1935. She was launched on 28 March 1936, and commissioned into the RAN on 21 January 1937.

== Operational history ==
=== World War II ===
Swan served as an escort and patrol vessel during World War II and escorted many convoys, including the Pensacola Convoy, in Australian waters and the South-West Pacific. On 12 January Swan arrived at Ambon escorting Bantam with reinforcements and remained there until 18 January, engaging bombers during raids on 15–16 January. In late January 1942 the ship was assigned to the short lived American-British-Dutch-Australian Command.

The ship was part of the escort, led by USS Houston with the destroyer USS Peary and HMAS Warrego, for a convoy composed of Meigs, Mauna Loa, Portmar, and Tulagi leaving Darwin before two in the morning of 15 February for Koepang carrying troops to reinforce forces already defending Timor. By eleven in the morning the convoy was being shadowed by a Japanese flying boat that dropped some bombs without causing damage before departing. The next morning another shadowing aircraft had taken position and before noon the convoy was attacked by bombers and flying boats in two waves. After the attacks the convoy continued toward Timor for a few hours with Houston launching a scout plane seeking the enemy position. ABDA suspected the presence of Japanese carriers, an imminent invasion of Timor and a support fleet lying in wait and thus ordered the convoy back to Darwin which it reached before noon on the 18th.

Swan was in Darwin the next day when the Japanese attacked the port and was secured alongside Neptuna, which had a cargo that included 100 depth charges. The ship managed to get underway and contributed fire in defence, but was heavily damaged by a near miss. Three crew members were killed in the attack. The day after the attack Warrego escorted the damaged Swan through Clarence Strait.

On 2 September 1942 Swan with HMAS Castlemaine departed Townsville escorting Sea Witch, Taroona, Anshun and 's Jacob bound for Port Moresby and Milne Bay. HMAS Arunta joined to be the escort with Swan for Anshun and 's Jacob to Milne Bay while Castlemaine escorted Sea Witch and Taroona to Port Moresby.

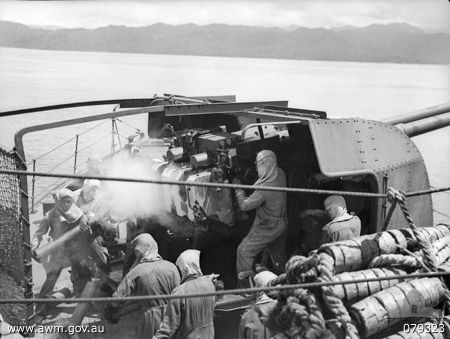
4-in twin Mk XVI guns on HMAS Swan in action, 26 February 1945

General Kenneth Eather, GOC Australian 11th Division, accepted the surrender of Japanese forces in New Ireland from General Ito on board Swan on 18 September 1945. From late 1945 to August 1948 she was used to command the RAN's minesweeping operation in Australian and New Guinean waters.

The ship received three battle honours for her wartime service: "Darwin 1942", "Pacific 1941–45", and "New Guinea 1943–44".

=== Post-war ===
Swan paid off to reserve on 18 August 1950, was converted to a training ship between October 1954 and February 1956 and recommissioned on 10 February 1956.

== Decommissioning and fate ==
Swan paid off for disposal on 20 September 1962 and was sold for scrap to Hurley and Dewhurst of Sydney on 5 June 1964.
