= National Service Act 1951 =

Repealed Australian legislation

Parliament of Australia
- Long title: An Act to provide for National Service in the Defence Force, and for other purposes.
- Citation: No. 2 of 1951
- Territorial extent: States and territories of Australia
- Assented to: 17 March 1951
- Repealed: 30 June 1992

Amended by
- National Service Act 1964
- Status: Repealed

The National Service Act 1951 is a repealed act of the Parliament of the Commonwealth of Australia. It provided for the compulsory call-up of males turning 18 on or after 1 November 1950, for service training of 176 days. Trainees were required to remain on the Reserve of the Commonwealth Military Forces (CMF) for five years from initial call up. Men could nominate the service in which they wished to be trained. Those nominating the Navy or the Air Force were considered only if they volunteered for service outside Australia. The first call-up notice was issued on 12 April 1951.

== Background ==
In the midst of communist insurgencies around Southeast Asia and the start of the Korean War, the Menzies Government introduced this act to parliament. Additionally, the 1951 Australian Communist Party ban referendum was held as fear of Communism reached fever pitch in Australia.

== Amendments ==
The act was amended multiple times. The notable listing includes:

- National Service Act (No. 2) 1951
- National Service Act 1953
- National Service Acts 1957
- National Service Act 1964
- National Service Act 1965
- National Service Act 1968
- National Service Act 1971

== Legacy ==
Between 1951 and 1959, over 500,000 men registered, 52 intakes were organised and some 227,000 men were trained.

In 1957, National Service with the Navy and the Air Force was discontinued. Registration remained compulsory but the intake to the Army was cut to almost a third (12,000 trainees) by instituting a ballot for selection. On 24 November 1959, Cabinet decided that National Service call-ups should be terminated and that arrangements for the January 1960 intake would be cancelled.
