= Australian Commonwealth Naval Board =

Governing authority of the Royal Australian Navy

The Australian Commonwealth Naval Board was the governing authority over the Royal Australian Navy from its inception and through World Wars I and II. The board was established on 1 March 1911 and consisted of civilian members of the Australian government as well as naval officers.
