= HMAS Kangaroo =

Boom defence vessel of the Royal Australian Navy

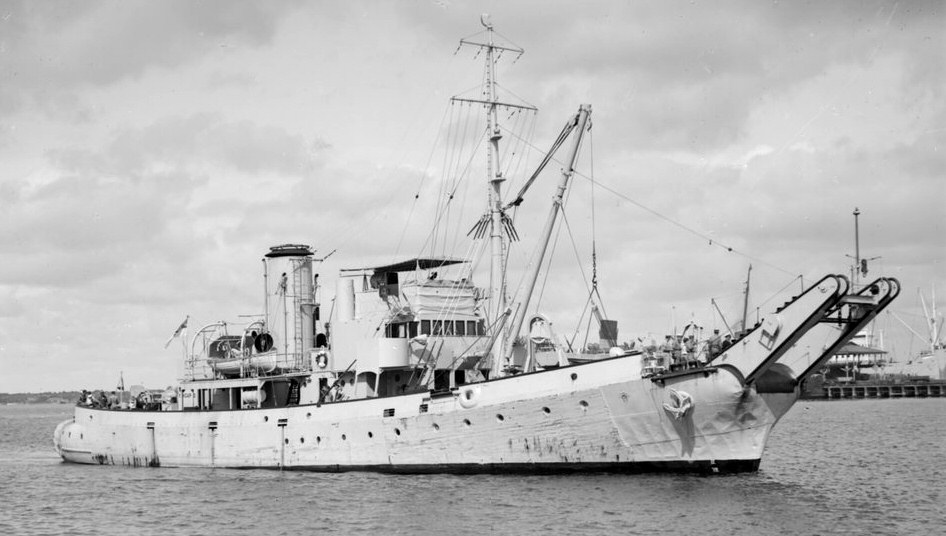
- HMAS Kangaroo in 1947

History

Australia
- Namesake: Kangaroo
- Builder: Cockatoo Docks & Engineering Company
- Laid down: 15 November 1939
- Launched: 4 May 1940
- Commissioned: 27 September 1940
- Decommissioned: 15 December 1955
- Identification: P80
- Honours and awards: Battle honours: Darwin 1942–43
- Fate: Scrapped in 1968

General characteristics
- Type: Boom defence vessel
- Displacement: 768 tons (standard)
- Length: 178 ft 3 in (54.33 m)
- Beam: 32 ft (9.8 m)
- Draught: 11 ft 3 in (3.43 m)
- Propulsion: Triple expansion, 1,850 hp, single screw
- Speed: 11.5 knots (21.3 km/h; 13.2 mph)
- Complement: 32
- Armament: 1 × 12-pounder gun; 2 × Oerlikon 20 mm cannon; 2 × Lewis Gun; 2 × .30 inch Marlin MG

HMAS Kangaroo was a Bar-class boom defence vessel of the Royal Australian Navy (RAN). Although originally ordered as a boom vessel, Kangaroo was at one point to be built as the prototype for what became the Bathurst-class corvettes, but reverted to the boom defence design before construction started. Launched in 1940, the ship spent most of World War II operating the anti-submarine net in Darwin. Kangaroo remained in service until 1955, and after several years as an accommodation ship, was sold for scrapping in 1967.

== Design and construction ==
In 1937, three ships were ordered by the RAN for use as Boom Defense Vessels. The plan was altered in early 1938 to require only two ships; the third, Kangaroo was earmarked to be constructed as a prototype local defense vessel. The RAN's Director of Engineering was instructed to prepare plans for the ship in July 1938, which were completed six months later. The ship was to weigh 680 tons, with a speed of 15.5 knots (28.7 km/h; 17.8 mph), and a range of 2,850 miles (4,590 km). Kangaroo would have been armed with two 4-inch guns and depth charges, and equipped with asdic.

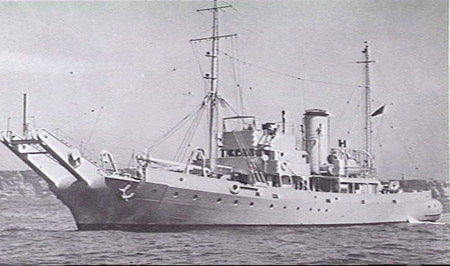
HMAS Kangaroo in 1940

Before construction could begin, the number of boom vessels was increased back to three, and Kangaroo was laid down to this design by Cockatoo Docks and Engineering Company on 15 November 1939. Kangaroo was launched on 4 May 1940, and commissioned into the RAN on 27 September 1940. The unused design was later modified and used for the Bathurst-class corvettes.

== Operational history ==
Kangaroo arrived in Darwin in January 1941 and established and maintained the anti-submarine boom in Darwin Harbour with three similar vessels. Kangaroo suffered damage and one fatality during the bombing of Darwin in February 1942. She was repaired in Brisbane from 1 April to 20 May 1942 and spent the remainder of the war in Darwin. She received the battle honour "Darwin 1942–43" for her wartime service.

Kangaroo remained in active commission after the war and performed various duties Australian and New Guinea waters during the late 1940s and early 1950s.

== Decommissioning and fate ==
She paid off to reserve on 15 December 1955 and was used as an accommodation ship. Kangaroo was sold for scrap on 28 August 1967 and was scrapped in 1968.
