= Bar-class boom defence vessel =

1939 class of British boom defence vessels

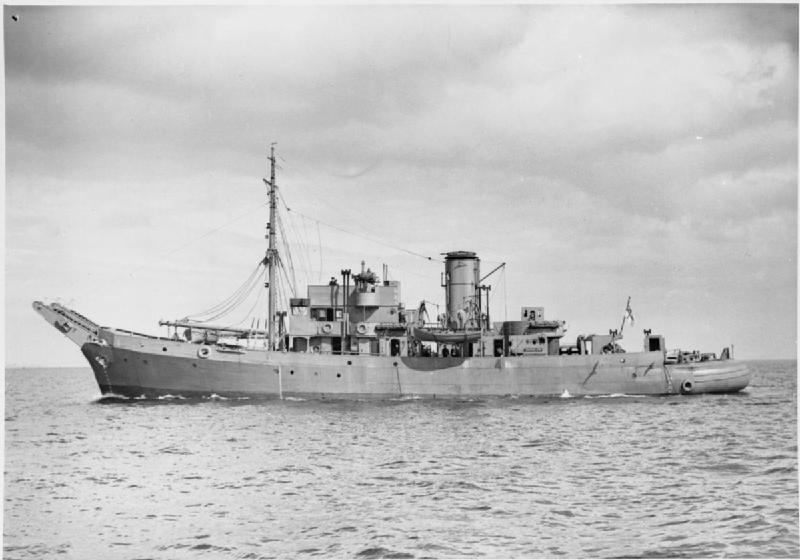
- HMS Barglow

Class overview
- Operators: Royal Navy; Royal Australian Navy; South African Navy; (Empire of Japan) Imperial Japanese Navy
- Completed: 74

General characteristics
- Type: Boom defence vessel
- Displacement: 533 long tons (542 t)
- Length: 41.14 m (135 ft 0 in)
- Beam: 7.77 m (25 ft 6 in)
- Draught: 3.81 m (12 ft 6 in)
- Speed: 9.5 knots (17.6 km/h; 10.9 mph)
- Complement: 30
- Armament: 1 × 12-pounder gun

The Bar class were a class of boom defence vessels of the Royal Navy, Royal Australian Navy and South African Navy during World War II.

== Ships ==
=== Royal Navy ===
- HMS Barbain (Z01)
- HMS Barbarian (Z18)
- HMS Barbastel (Z276)
- HMS Barberry (Z257)
- HMS Barbette (1937) (Sold to the Turkish Navy 3 March 1941)
- HMS Barbette (Z242) (Broken up October 1965 in Belgium)
- HMS Barbican (Z43)
- HMS Barbour (Z169)
- HMS Barbourne (Z170)
- HMS Barbrake (Z173) (transferred to the South African Naval Forces in 1943)
- HMS Barbridge (Z222)
- HMS Barbrook (Z03)
- HMS Barcarole (Z287)
- HMS Barcastle (Z09)
- HMS Barcliff (Z70)
- HMS Barclose (Z174)
- HMS Barcock (Z177)
- HMS Barcombe (Z16)
- HMS Barcote (Z52)
- HMS Barcroft (Z22)
- HMS Bardell (Z195)
- HMS Bardolf (Z171)
- HMS Barfair (Z31)
- HMS Barfield (Z42)

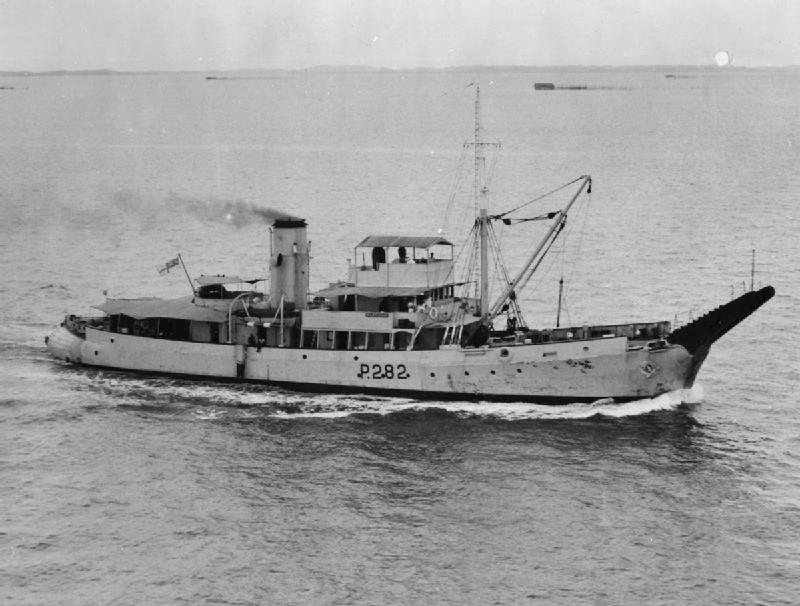
HMS Barfoam at Singapore, early in World War II

- HMS Barfoam (Z182)
- HMS Barfoil (Z194)
- HMS Barfoot (Z202)
- HMS Barford (Z209)
- HMS Barfoss (Z200)
- HMS Barfount (Z190)
- HMS Barglow (Z205)
- HMS Barhill (Z225)
- HMS Barholm (Z211)
- HMS Barilla (Z17)
- HMS Baritone (Z271)
- HMS Barking (Z181)
- HMS Barkis (Z277)
- HMS Barlake (Z39)
- HMS Barlane (Z48)
- HMS Barleycorn (Z256)
- HMS Barlight (Z57) (scuttled 19 December 1941, salvaged by IJN as Ma.101, after war to China)
- HMS Barlow (Z60)
- HMS Barmill (Z67)
- HMS Barmond (Z232)
- HMS Barmouth (Z77)
- HMS Barnaby (Z237)
- HMS Barnard (Z241)
- HMS Barndale (Z92)
- HMS Barneath (Z245)
- HMS Barnehurst (Z84)
- HMS Baron (Z262)
- HMS Baronia (Z87) (built by Charles Hill & Sons)
- HMS Barrage (Z54)
- HMS Barranca (Z65)
- HMS Barrhead (Z40)
- HMS Barricade (Z83)
- HMS Barrier (Z98)
- HMS Barrington (Z59)
- HMS Barrymore (Z73)
- HMS Barsing (Z75)
- HMS Barsound (Z89)
- HMS Barspear (Z224)
- HMS Barstoke (Z32)
- HMS Barthorpe (Z95)
- HMS Bartizan (Z261)
- HMS Barwell (Z46)
- HMS Barwind (Z58)
- HMS Barcross (Z185), transferred to the South African Naval Forces in 1943.
- HMS Barflake (Z184) (lost 22 November 1943)
- HMS Barnstone (Z37)
- HMS Barova (Z94) (built by Charles Hill & Sons)

=== Royal Australian Navy ===
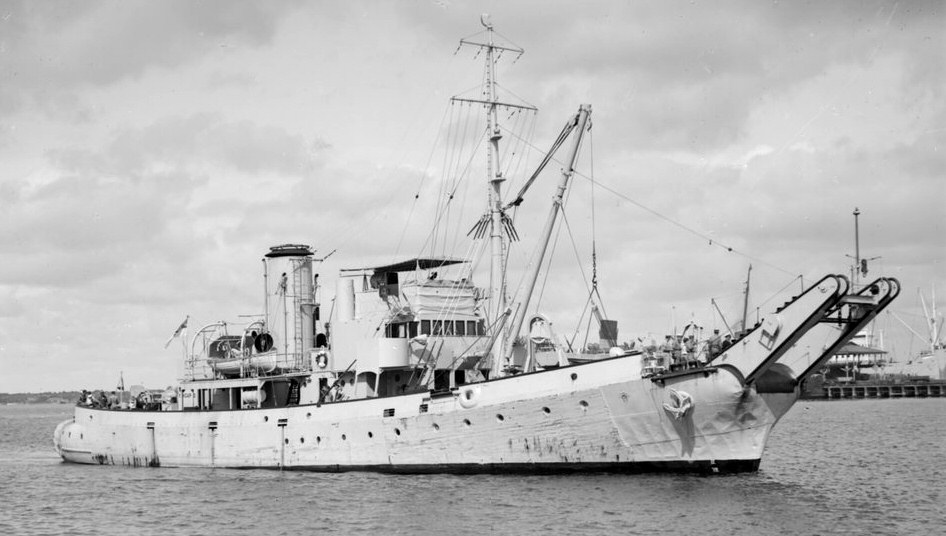
HMAS Kangaroo in 1947

Name	Ship builder	Launched	Fate
HMAS Koala	Cockatoo Docks and Engineering Company, Sydney	14 November 1939	Sold in 1969
HMAS Kangaroo	Cockatoo Docks and Engineering Company, Sydney	4 May 1940	Sold in 1967
HMAS Karangi	Cockatoo Docks and Engineering Company, Sydney	16 August 1941	Sold in 1966

=== South African Navy ===
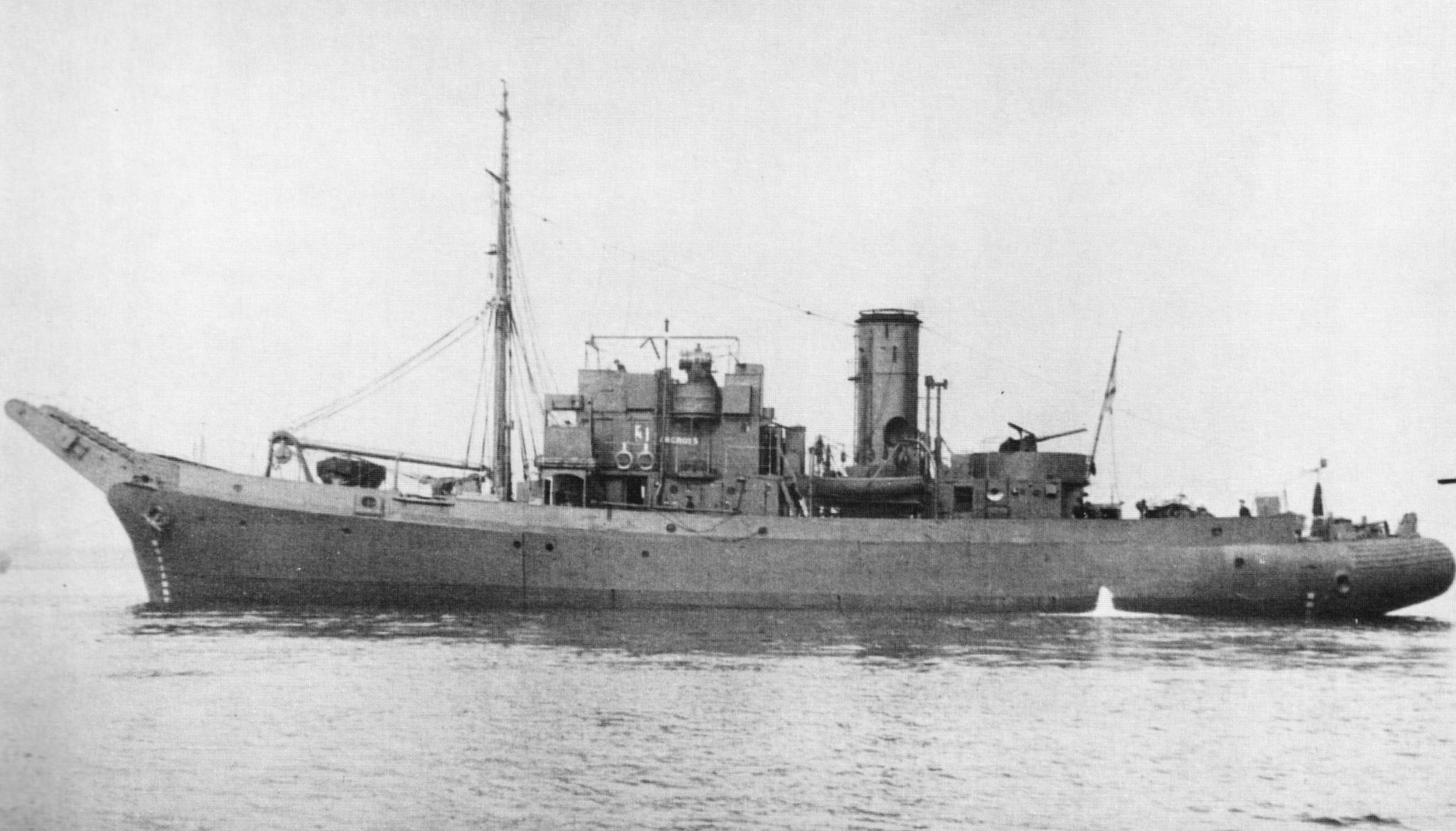
HMS Barcross (1943), later renamed SAS Somerset

Name	Ship builder	Commissioned	Fate
SAS Somerset (ex HMS Barcross)	Blythe S.B. Co	21 January 1943	Decommissioned 31 March 1986. Museum ship, Cape Town from 2 September 1988 until scrapping in April 2024
SAS Fleur (ex HMS Barbrake)	William Simons & Co, Renfrew, Scotland)	15 February 1943	Sunk by naval gunfire off Simonstown on 8 October 1965

== Surviving ships ==
- HMAS Karangi is the only survivor of the RAN fleet in Homebush Bay as an abandoned wreck.
