= South Point =

South Point may mean:

- South Point, Lexington, a neighborhood in Lexington, Kentucky, USA
- South Point, Ohio, a village in Lawrence County, Ohio, USA
- South Point, Texas, a census-designated place in Cameron County, Texas, USA
- South Point Hotel, Casino & Spa, in Las Vegas, Nevada, USA
- South Point Lighthouse in the Bahamas
- South Point (Wilsons Promontory), the southernmost point in mainland Australia, on Wilsons Promontory, Victoria, Australia
- South Point School, Kolkata, West Bengal, India
- South Point High School (North Carolina) in Belmont, North Carolina
- South Point High School (Ohio) in South Point, Ohio
- Ka Lae, commonly called "South Point", the southern tip of the island of Hawaii, also the most southern point of land in the USA
- South.Point Tuggeranong, a shopping mall in the Canberra district of Tuggeranong
- South Point (shopping mall) in McDonough, Georgia
- Southpoint Shopping Centre, in Hillsdale, NSW
- South Point, Rolleston, a shopping centre in Rolleston, New Zealand
- South Point (Deception Island), a headland in Deception Island, South Shetland Islands
- The Streets at Southpoint, a shopping mall in Durham, North Carolina
- Southpoint (Jacksonville), a business center in Jacksonville, Florida
