= HMAS Ovens =

Museum ship in Fremantle, Western Australia

Coordinates: 32.05526°S 115.73868°E

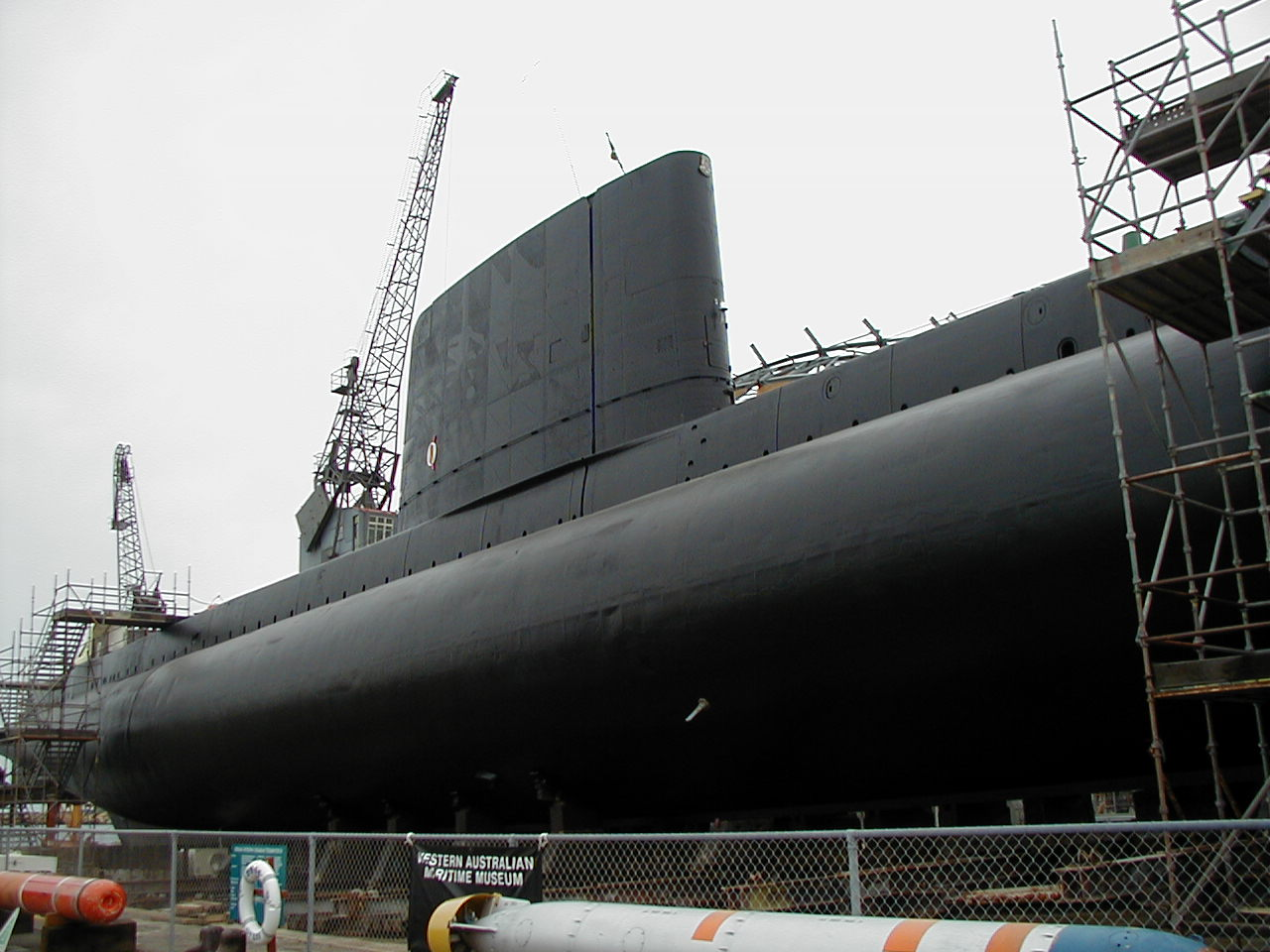
- HMAS Ovens at the Western Australian Maritime Museum

History

Australia
- Builder: Scotts Shipbuilding & Engineering Company
- Laid down: 17 June 1966
- Launched: 4 December 1967
- Commissioned: 18 April 1969
- Decommissioned: 1 December 1995
- Motto: "Silence is Golden"
- Status: Museum ship since November 1998
- Badge

General characteristics
- Class & type: Oberon-class submarine
- Displacement: 1,610 tons standard; 2,030 tons surfaced; 2,410 tons submerged
- Length: 295.2 ft (90.0 m)
- Beam: 26.5 ft (8.1 m)
- Draught: 18 ft (5.5 m)
- Propulsion: 2 × Admiralty Standard Range supercharged V16 diesel generators; 2 × English Electric motors; 3,500 bhp, 4,500 shp; 2 shafts
- Speed: 12 knots (22 km/h; 14 mph) surfaced; 17 knots (31 km/h; 20 mph) submerged; 11 knots (20 km/h; 13 mph) at snorkel depth
- Range: 9,000 nautical miles (17,000 km; 10,000 mi) at 12 knots (22 km/h; 14 mph)
- Test depth: 200 metres (660 ft)
- Complement: As launched: 8 officers, 56 sailors; At decommissioning: 8 officers, 60 sailors
- Sensors & processing systems: Sonar: Atlas Elektronik Type CSU3-41 bow array; BAC Type 2007 flank array; Sperry BQG-4 Micropuffs rangefinding array; Radar: Kelvin Hughes Type 1006
- Armament: Torpedo tubes: 6 × 21-inch (53 cm) bow tubes; 2 × short-length 21-inch (53 cm) stern tubes (later removed); 1996 payload: Mix of 20: Mark 48 Mod 4 torpedoes; UGM-84 Sub Harpoon missiles

HMAS Ovens (S 70) is an Oberon-class submarine, formerly of the Royal Australian Navy (RAN). She was one of six Oberons built for the Royal Australian Navy by the Scottish Scotts Shipbuilding & Engineering Company, and entered service in 1969. The vessel was named for Irishman and Australian explorer John Ovens (1788–1825) and for whom the Victorian river Ovens was named. During her career, Ovens was the first RAN submarine to deploy with the ANZUK force, and the first RAN submarine to fire an armed Mark 48 torpedo, sinking the target ship Colac. The boat was decommissioned in 1995, and is preserved at the WA Maritime Museum as a museum ship.

== Design and construction ==
The Oberon class was based heavily on the preceding Porpoise class of submarines, with changes made to improve the vessels' hull integrity, sensor systems, and stealth capabilities. Eight submarines were ordered for the RAN, in two batches of four. The first batch (including Ovens) was approved in 1963, and the second batch was approved during the late 1960s, although two of these were cancelled before construction started in 1969, with the funding redirected to the Fleet Air Arm. This was the fourth time the RAN had attempted to establish a submarine branch.

The submarine was 90.0 metres (295.2 ft) long, with a beam of 8.1 metres (26.5 ft), and a draught of 5.5 metres (18 ft) when surfaced. At full load displacement, she displaced 2,030 tons when surfaced, and 2,410 tons when submerged. The two propeller shafts were each driven by an English Electric motor providing 3,500 brake horsepower and 4,500 shaft horsepower; the electricity for these was generated by two Admiralty Standard Range supercharged V16 diesel generators. The submarine could travel at up to 12 knots (22 km/h; 14 mph) on the surface, and up to 17 knots (31 km/h; 20 mph) when submerged, had a maximum range of 9,000 nautical miles (17,000 km; 10,000 mi) at 12 knots (22 km/h; 14 mph), and a test depth of 200 metres (660 ft) below sea level. When launched, the boat had a company of 8 officers and 56 sailors, but by the time she decommissioned, the number of sailors had increased to 60. In addition, up to 16 trainees could be carried.

The main armament of the Oberons consisted of six 21-inch (533.4 mm) torpedo tubes. The British Mark 8 torpedo was initially carried by the submarine; this was later replaced by the wire-guided Mark 23. Between March 1980 and August 1982, the Australian Oberons were upgraded to carry United States Navy Mark 48 torpedoes and UGM-84 Sub Harpoon anti-ship missiles. As of 1996, the standard payload of an Australian Oberon was a mix of 20 Mark 48 Mod 4 torpedoes and Sub Harpoon missiles. Some or all of the torpedo payload could be replaced by Mark 5 Stonefish sea mines, which were deployed through the torpedo tubes. On entering service, two stern-mounted, short-length 21-inch (53 cm) torpedo tubes for Mark 20 anti-submarine torpedoes. However, the development of steerable wire-guided torpedoes made the less-capable aft-firing torpedoes redundant; they were closed off, and later removed during a refit.

Ovens was laid down by Scotts Shipbuilding & Engineering Company at Greenock, Scotland on 17 June 1966, launched on 4 December 1967, and commissioned into the RAN on 18 April 1969.

== Operational history ==
In 1970, Ovens visited ports in New Zealand. The submarine visited New Zealand again during late August and early September 1971, and was used to train Royal New Zealand Navy vessels in anti-submarine warfare.

In January 1972, Ovens was deployed to South East Asia to serve with the ANZUK force: the first RAN submarine to do so. During the deployment, which lasted until June, the boat participated in SEATO Exercise Sea Hawk. On 3 August, the submarine encountered the launch Sea Witch, abandoned and adrift, about 80 kilometres (50 mi) off Newcastle, New South Wales.

In May 1976, the submarine was sent to the Far East on a five-and-a-half-month deployment. Before returning to home port, Ovens participated in the Kangaroo 2 multinational exercise, which simulated an attack on a coastal area. Assigned to the Orange (defending) force, Ovens was able to claim successful 'attacks' on 170,000 tonnes (370 million pounds) of shipping, including the aircraft carrier USS Enterprise. Returning to HMAS Platypus after the exercise, the submarine sailed into Sydney Harbour claiming a "clean sweep" by lashing a broom to the attack periscope.

Ovens became the first RAN submarine to fire an armed Mark 48 torpedo, when she sank the decommissioned Bathurst-class corvette HMAS Colac on 4 March 1987. On her return to port, Ovens flew a 'Jolly Roger' to indicate a successful mission: the first time a RAN submarine had done so.

The submarine made a port visit to Geelong, Victoria in June 1995.

== Decommissioning and fate ==
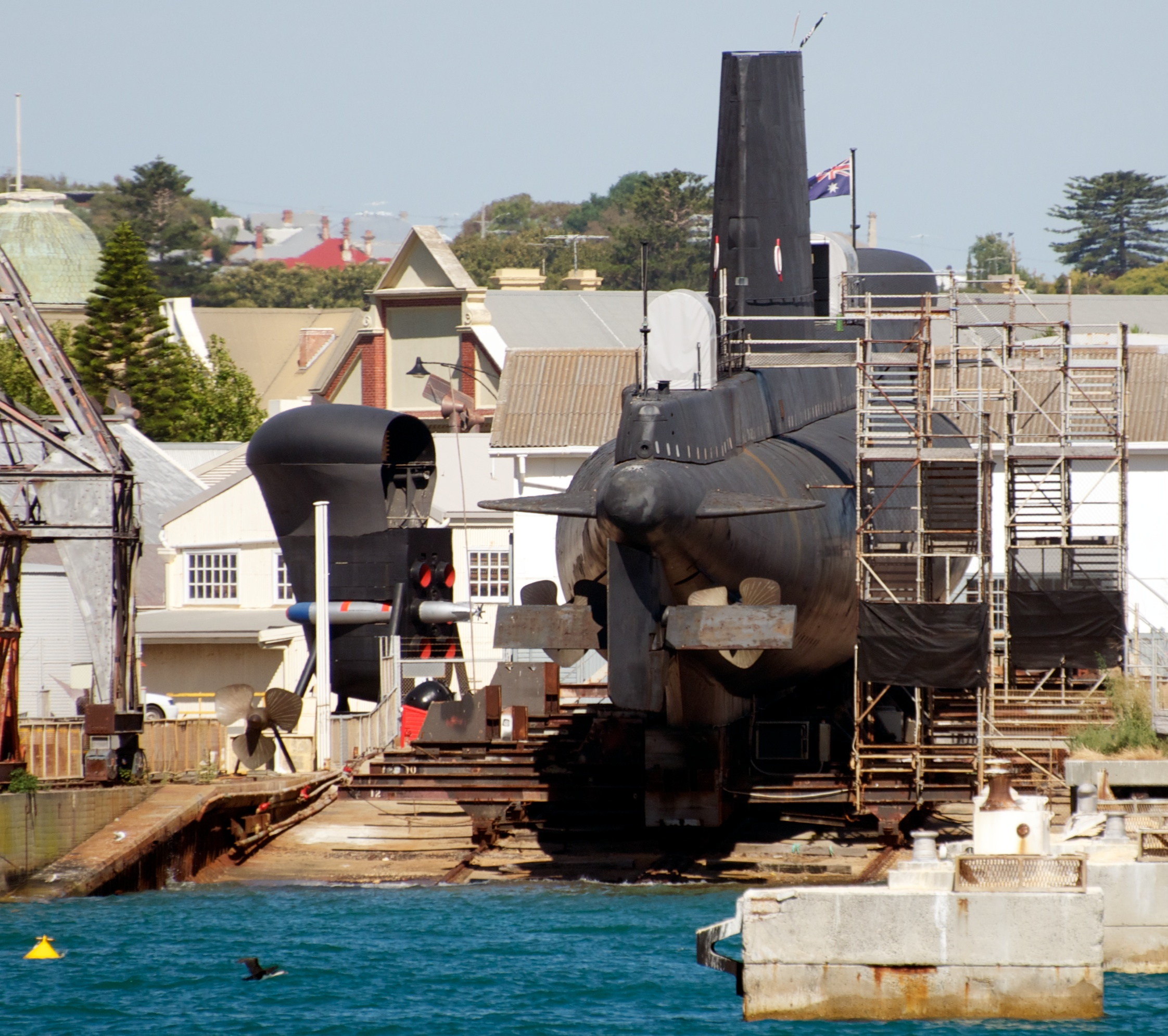
View of Ovens in the Western Australian Maritime Museum dry-dock, as seen from the harbour

Ovens paid off on 1 December 1995. The submarine was gifted to the WA Maritime Museum in November 1998. She is preserved as a museum ship at the WA Maritime Museum in Fremantle.

== Sources ==
- Bastock, John (1975). Australia's Ships of War. Cremorne, NSW: Angus & Robertson. ISBN 0-207-12927-4. OCLC 2525523.
- Begg, Peter (11 April 2013). "Naval gazing adds pier pressure". Geelong Advertiser.
- Chant, Christopher (1987). A Compedium of Armaments and Military Hardware. Routledge. ISBN 0-7102-0720-4.
- Collings, Jon (19 June 2002). "Submission 18: Department of Defence" (PDF). In Joint Committee of Public Accounts and Audit (ed.). Review of the Accrual Budget Documentation (Report). Government of Australia.
- Cooper, Alastair (2001). Stevens, David (ed.). The Royal Australian Navy. The Australian Centenary History of Defence (vol III). South Melbourne, VIC: Oxford University Press. ISBN 0-19-554116-2. OCLC 50418095.
- Dennis. The Oxford Companion to Australian Military history.
- Richards, Bill; Smith, Peter (December 2006). "Onslow's Jolly Roger". Signals (77). Australian National Maritime Museum: 10–12. ISSN 1033-4688.
- "Ovens' clean sweep in 'K2' climaxed long deployment" (PDF). Navy News. Royal Australian Navy. p. 8.
- "HMAS Ovens". Ship Histories. Royal Australian Navy.
- "HMAS Colac". Royal Australian Navy.
- Sharpe, Richard, ed. (1992). Jane's Fighting Ships 1992–93 (95th ed.). Surrey, UK: Jane's Information Group. ISBN 0-7106-0983-3. OCLC 25930144.
- Sharpe, Richard, ed. (March 1996). Jane's Fighting Ships 1996–97 (99th ed.). Surrey: Jane's Information Group. ISBN 0-7106-1355-5. OCLC 34998928.
- Shaw, Lindsey (2005). HMAS Onslow: cold war warrior. Sydney, NSW: Australian National Maritime Museum. ISBN 0-9751428-4-4. OCLC 225390609.
