= HMS Satyr (P214) =

Submarine of the Royal Navy

Coordinates: 62°16′N 5°06′E

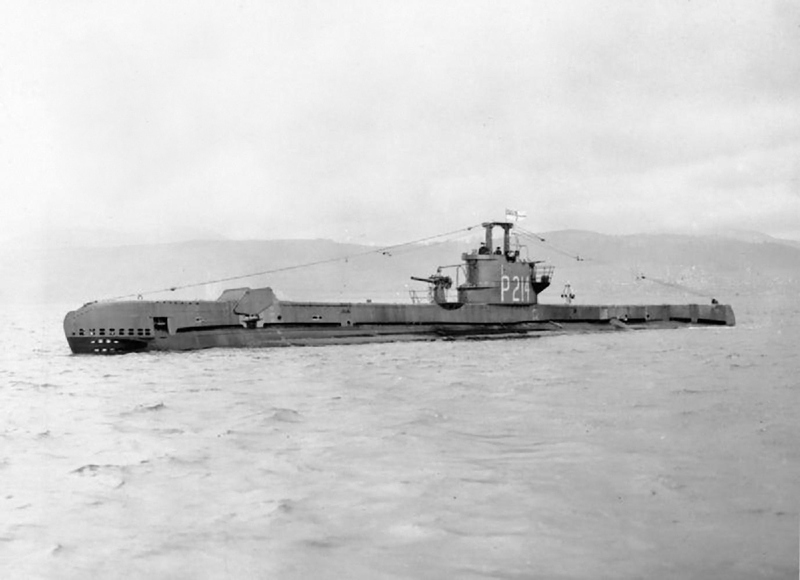
- Satyr

History

United Kingdom
- Name: Satyr
- Builder: Scotts Shipbuilding and Engineering Company, Greenock
- Laid down: 8 June 1940
- Launched: 28 September 1942
- Commissioned: 8 February 1943
- Renamed: to French Navy February 1952 to August 1961 as Saphir
- Fate: Scrapped, April 1962
- Badge

General characteristics
- Class & type: S-class submarine
- Displacement: 814–872 tons surfaced; 990 tons submerged
- Length: 217 ft (66 m)
- Beam: 23 ft 6 in (7.16 m)
- Draught: 11 ft (3.4 m)
- Speed: 14.75 knots (27.32 km/h; 16.97 mph) surfaced; 8 knots (15 km/h; 9.2 mph) submerged
- Complement: 48
- Armament: 6 × forward 21-inch (533 mm) torpedo tubes, one aft; 13 torpedoes; 1 × 3-inch (76 mm) gun (QF 4-inch on later boats); 1 × 20 mm cannon; 3 × .303-calibre machine gun

HMS Satyr was an S-class submarine of the Royal Navy, and part of the third group built of that class. She was built by Scotts, of Greenock and launched on 28 September 1942.

== Design and description ==
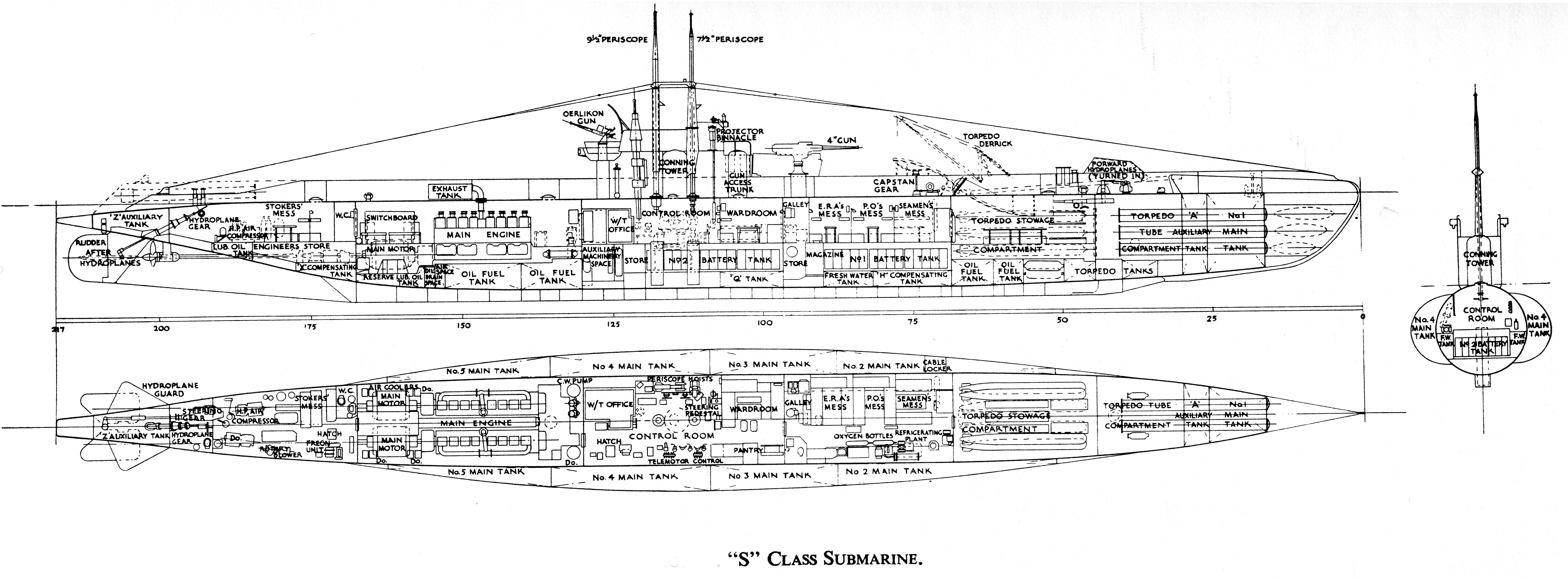
Schematic drawing of a S-class submarine

The S-class submarines were designed to patrol the restricted waters of the North Sea and the Mediterranean Sea. The third batch was slightly enlarged and improved over the preceding second batch of the S class. The submarines had a length of 217 feet (66.1 m) overall, a beam of 23 feet 9 inches (7.2 m) and a draught of 14 feet 8 inches (4.5 m). They displaced 842 long tons (856 t) on the surface and 990 long tons (1,010 t) submerged. The S-class submarines had a crew of 48 officers and ratings. They had a diving depth of 300 feet (91.4 m).

For surface running, the boats were powered by two 950-brake-horsepower (708 kW) diesel engines, each driving one propeller shaft. When submerged each propeller was driven by a 650-horsepower (485 kW) electric motor. They could reach 15 knots (28 km/h; 17 mph) on the surface and 10 knots (19 km/h; 12 mph) underwater. On the surface, the third-batch boats had a range of 6,000 nautical miles (11,000 km; 6,900 mi) at 10 knots (19 km/h; 12 mph) and 120 nmi (220 km; 140 mi) at 3 knots (5.6 km/h; 3.5 mph) submerged.

The third-batch submarines were armed with seven 21-inch (533 mm) torpedo tubes. A half-dozen of these were in the bow and there was one external tube in the stern. They carried six reload torpedoes for the bow tubes for a total of thirteen torpedoes. Twelve mines could be carried in lieu of the internally stowed torpedoes. They were also armed with a 3-inch (76 mm) deck gun. It is uncertain if Satyr was completed with a 20-millimetre (0.8 in) Oerlikon light AA gun or had one added later. The third-batch S-class boats were fitted with either a Type 129AR or 138 ASDIC system and a Type 291 or 291W early-warning radar.

== Career ==
The crew of the Satyr with their Jolly Roger flag, 1944. The symbols represent six surface ships torpedoed (including one warship) and a U-Boat.

Satyr spent much of her wartime career serving in home waters, where she sank the Norwegian merchant Nordnorge, and the German submarine U-987. She also torpedoed the wreck of the German merchant Emsland which was aground off Stadlandet, Norway after being heavily damaged by British torpedo bombers on 20 January 1944. On 11 February the wreck was hit again by aerial torpedoes. Satyr also unsuccessfully attacked the German merchants Bochum and Emma Sauber, and a German convoy off Egersund, Norway.

During 1944–1945 Satyr was disarmed, streamlined and given more powerful batteries to serve as a high speed target submarine.

She was lent to the French navy between February 1952 and August 1961, and renamed Saphir. After 20 years of service, she was broken up in April 1962 at Charlestown, Fife.

== Bibliography ==
- Akermann, Paul (2002). Encyclopaedia of British Submarines 1901–1955 (reprint of the 1989 ed.). Penzance, Cornwall: Periscope Publishing. ISBN 1-904381-05-7.
- Bagnasco, Erminio (1977). Submarines of World War Two. Annapolis, Maryland: Naval Institute Press. ISBN 0-87021-962-6.
- Best, Brian (2017). The Forgotten VCs: The Victoria Crosses of the War in the Far East During WW2. Oxford, UK. ISBN 978-1526718006.
- Chesneau, Roger, ed. (1980). Conway's All the World's Fighting Ships 1922–1946. Greenwich, UK: Conway Maritime Press. ISBN 0-85177-146-7.
- Heden, Karl Eric (2006). Sunken Ships, World War II: U.S. Naval Chronology Including Submarine Losses of the United States, England, Germany, Japan, Italy. History Reference Center: Branden Books. ISBN 0828321183.
- McCartney, Innes (2006). British Submarines 1939–1945. New Vanguard. Vol. 129. Oxford, UK: Osprey. ISBN 1-84603-007-2.
- Santoni, Alberto (2005) [1972]. Il vero traditore. Il ruolo documentato di Ultra nella guerra del Mediterraneo. Milan: Ugo Mursia Editore. pp. 257–258. ISBN 8842533297.
