= Action of 8 June 1945 =

- Part of the Pacific theatre of the Second World War
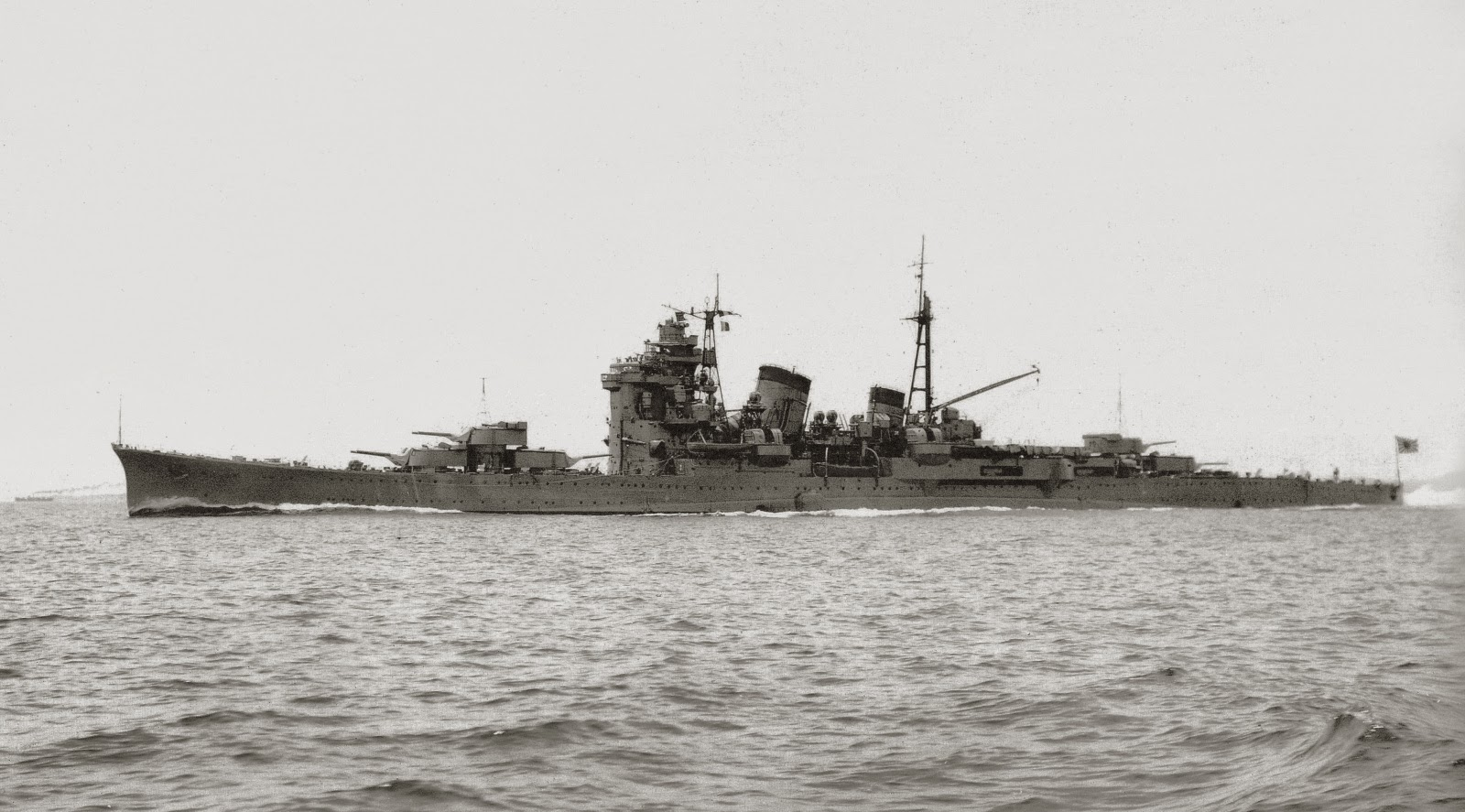
- Japanese Myōkō-class heavy cruiser Ashigara
Date	8 June 1945
Location	Bangka Strait, Java Sea 01°59′S 104°56′E
Result	British victory

Belligerents
United Kingdom	Japan

Commanders and leaders
Arthur Hezlet	Shin'ichi Ichise; Hayao Miura

Strength
HMS Trenchant; HMS Stygian	Heavy cruiser Ashigara; Destroyer Kamikaze

Casualties and losses
None	Ashigara sunk 1,350 dead

The action of 8 June 1945, sometimes called the Sinking of Ashigara was a naval action that resulted in the sinking of the Imperial Japanese Navy (IJN) heavy cruiser Ashigara by the British submarine HMS Trenchant. Ashigara was transporting Japanese troops from the Dutch East Indies for the defence of Singapore and its loss caused many casualties.

The voyage of Ashigara was revealed to the Allies by Ultra decrypts, which enabled Rear-Admiral James Fife, the US commander of submarines, South-West Pacific, to lay an ambush. Trenchant and HMS Stygian patrolled on either side of the Hendrik Klippen Shoal at the north end of the Bangka Strait, between Sumatra and Bangka Island. The British submarines were alerted by sighting reports from US submarines.

Trenchant fired a long-range salvo of eight torpedoes at Ashigara, from a tactically-awkward angle but the Japanese cruiser was too close to the Sumatran shore to turn away. The cruiser had to accelerate and turn towards the torpedoes but could only evade three of them. The five hits caused a big fire and Ashigara took on a list to starboard before capsizing. The destroyer Kamikaze rescued survivors but 1,350 men of the crew and troops being transported were killed.

== Background ==
=== Japanese navy reorganisation ===
On 5 February a new command, the Tenth Area Fleet (Vice-Admiral Shigeru Fukudome), with the 13th Air Fleet, was separated from the South-West Area Fleet. The main force of the Tenth Area Fleet was the Second Diversionary Attack Force with the 4th Carrier Squadron, comprising the battleship carriers Ise and Hyuga and the 5th Cruiser Squadron with the heavy cruisers Ashigara and Haguro. Ise and Hyuga were recalled to Japan and sailed from Singapore on 10 February with three destroyers, leaving the Tenth Area Fleet with only the 5th Cruiser squadron and the elderly destroyer Kamikaze.

=== Japanese strategic withdrawals ===
In early 1945 the Japanese began to remove distant garrisons in the South-West Pacific to reduce the defence perimeter to the Celebes, Borneo, Java, Sumatra and hold it for as long as possible, with Indo-China and Malaya in the centre of the defensive zone. Sho (Akiraka) was the withdrawal of troops from the Andaman and Nicobar islands to Singapore, Chi was the transfer of troops from Singapore to Indo-China, Transportation No. 10 was the transfer of the 48th Division from Timor and Ho was an evacuation of troops from Borneo and Surabaya that was not undertaken.

=== East Indies Fleet ===
When the British Pacific Fleet had been established in November 1944, the ships left in the Indian Ocean became the East Indies Fleet (Admiral Arthur Power) on 19 November. The fleet consisted of the 3rd Battle Squadron and the 5th Cruiser Squadron along with escort carriers, assault carriers, a ferry carrier and over thirty destroyers. British submarines of the 8th Submarine Flotilla had been based at Fremantle in Australia since September 1944 in the US 7th Fleet and had been patrolling the Java Sea, the south-west Pacific and the China Sea. In April 1945, the 8th Flotilla moved to Subic Bay in the Philippines and was replaced at Fremantle by the 4th Flotilla, there being 38 British and Dutch submarines in the Far East.

== Prelude ==
=== Operations Transport 10 and 11 ===
Operation Transport No. 10 and Operation Transport No. 11 to bring Japanese army troops from the Lesser Sunda Islands to Singapore via Batavia (now Jakarta) continued in June 1945. On 3 June Ashigara and Kamikaze left Singapore to transport the troops from Jakarta, departing for Singapore on 7 June, with about 1,600 troops and 480 long tons (490 t) of supplies embarked on Ashigara. (Note: The Naval monograph has 1,200 troops on the ship.) No air cover was forthcoming as the Japanese Army considered the moves a purely naval matter but reconnaissance flights of the Bangka Strait were flown from bases in western Java. Ashigara was escorted by the destroyer Kamikaze, which had survived the Japanese defeat at the Battle of the Malacca Strait (15–16 May). Their route was north from Jakarta, then north north-west through the Bangka Strait between Sumatra and Bangka Island, thence north to Singapore.

=== Allied submarine operations ===
In June, Ultra decrypts of Japanese naval messages revealed that Ashigara and Kamikaze were to move troops of the 48th Division from Jakarta to Singapore. The commander of submarines South-West Pacific, Rear-Admiral James Fife USN, ordered an ambush to be laid. The USS Blueback observed the departure of Ashigara and Kamikaze from Jakarta but was unable to manoeuvre into an attack position. Blueback's contact report was passed on to HMS Trenchant (Commander Arthur Hezlet). With some reluctance, Fife allowed Trenchant into the Bangka Strait, despite its dangerous shoals, currents and the presence of an Allied minefield. In company with the submarine HMS Stygian (Lieutenant G. C. Clarabut), Trenchant took up position on the northern approaches of Bangka Strait, Trenchant just inside the strait, south of Hendrik Klippen Shoal, while Stygian patrolled north of the shoal. Both submarines were on the surface; to get into position, Trenchant had to negotiate a minefield laid earlier by the Royal Netherlands Navy submarine HNLMS O 19.

== Action ==
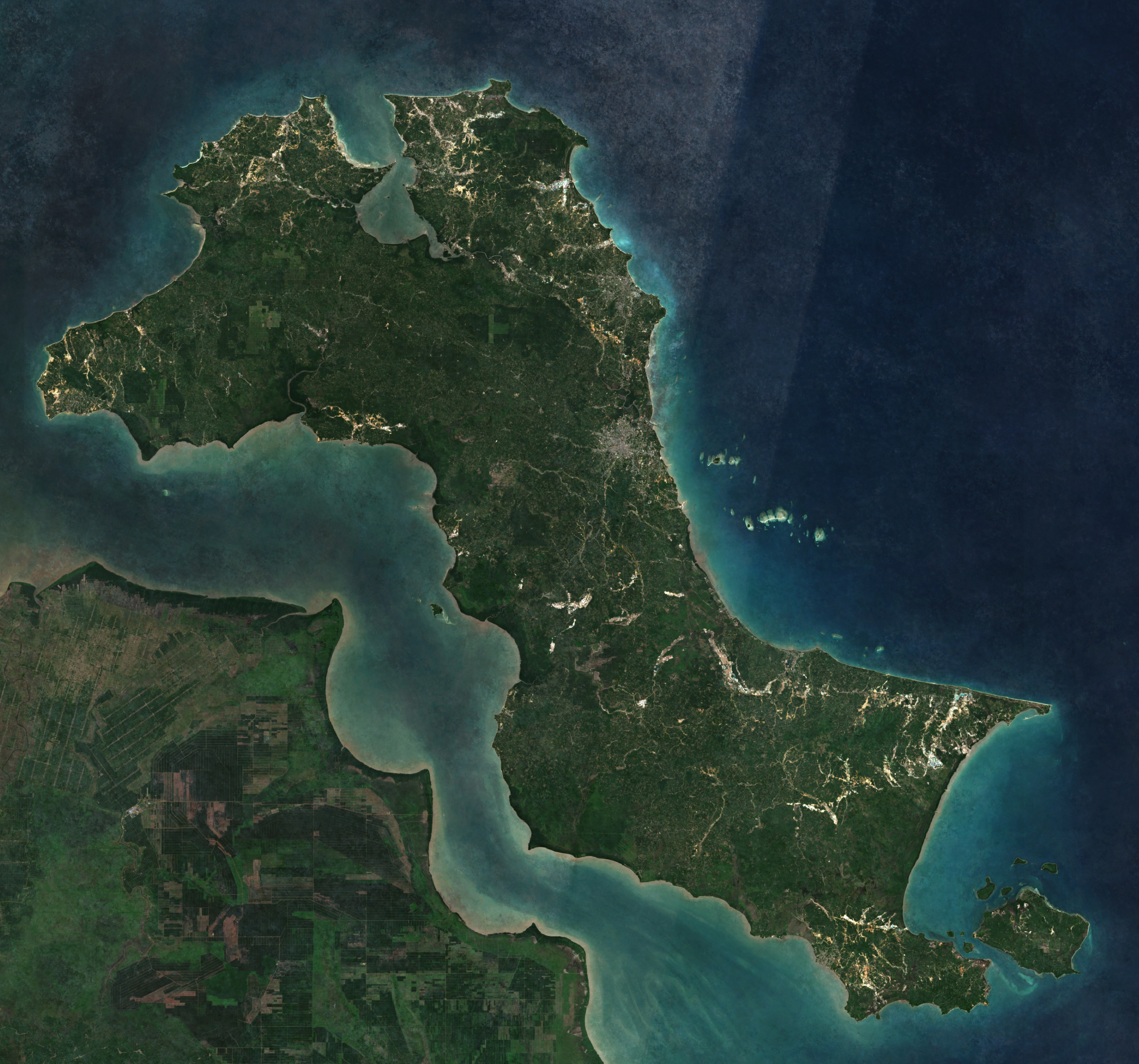
Satellite photograph of Bangka Island and the Bangka Strait

On 8 June 1945 at 4:23 a.m., Kamikaze was spotted by Trenchant, which in turn was spotted by the Japanese destroyer at 4:36 a.m. Kamikaze opened fire on Trenchant to no effect and Trenchant fired a torpedo from her stern tubes but kamikaze increased speed and the torpedo missed. Trenchant immediately sent a contact report to Stygian, which was patrolling to the north-west of the Bangka Strait, reporting that she had been detected by the destroyer, then changed position to east of the shoal and dived at 7:02 a.m. Hezlet spotted Kamikaze again at 9:55 a.m. heading north but disappearing from sight at 10:30 a.m.

Stygian saw star shells fired by Kamikaze at 4:39 a.m., during the short engagement with Trenchant and also received the contact report. She remained north of the shoal, judging correctly that Trenchant was clear of the Japanese, since there was no further gunfire and no depth charge detonations had been heard, then dived at 7:22 a.m. At 10:15 a.m. Kamikaze was seen heading north, along with patrolling Japanese aircraft. At 10:50 a.m., after Kamikaze changed course back to the south, Stygian fired two torpedoes at a range of 800 yd (730 m) but the torpedo tracks were spotted and evaded. Kamikaze attacked the submarine with depth charges, causing minor damage to Stygian but then lost contact, the sound of depth-charge explosions receding from the submarine.

Hezlet spotted the masts and upper works of Ashigara through his periscope at 11:48 a.m., bearing 177 degrees at a range of 12,000 yd (5.9 nmi; 6.8 mi; 11 km), heading north-west on a course of 330 degrees at a speed of 15 kn (28 km/h; 17 mph). Trenchant did not close the range, assuming that Ashigara would come closer to her by taking the more open water east of the shoal (closer to Bangka Island) but the heavy cruiser passed through the restricted water west of the shoal, closer to the Sumatra coast. It soon became clear to Hezlet that he could not reach a firing position closer to Ashigara than 4,000 yd (2.0 nmi; 2.3 mi; 3.7 km), almost at the maximum range of his torpedoes.

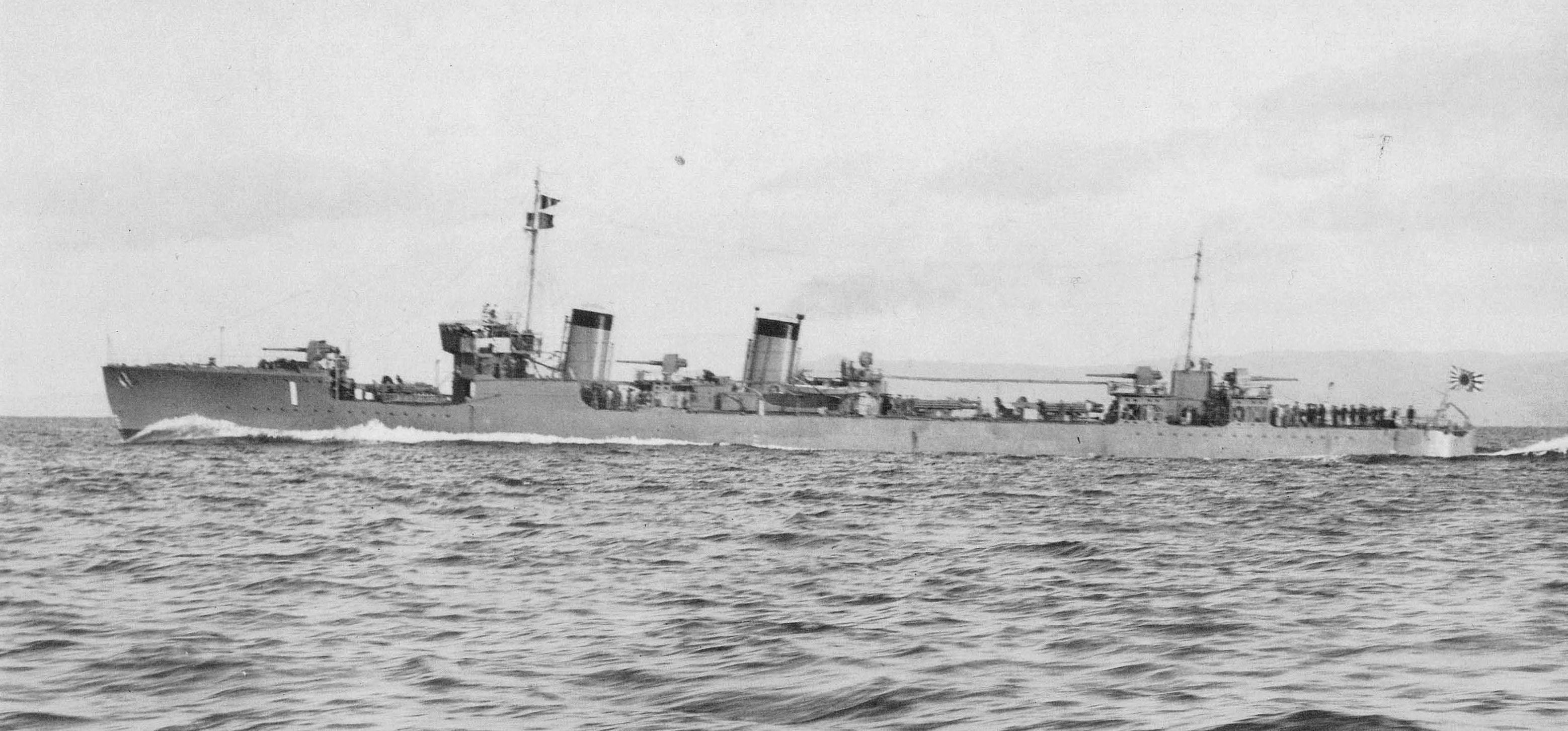
The Japanese destroyer Kamikaze II photographed in 1922

At such a distance, Hezlet had quickly to calculate a firing solution before the opportunity disappeared. At 12:09 a.m. Trenchant fired a full bow salvo of eight torpedoes from 30 degrees abaft (towards the stern) of the cruiser's starboard beam at a range of 4,700 yd (2.3 nmi; 2.7 mi; 4.3 km) aimed individually from a quarter of length ahead to a quarter of a length astern. Because of the Sumatran shore to port, the navigator on Ashigara could only attempt to change course to starboard by 120 degrees and increase speed to 20 kn (23 mph; 37 km/h) to comb the torpedo tracks as the troops on deck watched the torpedoes approaching. Three minutes later, five torpedoes struck Ashigara on the starboard side, one under the aft turret, one near the bow, then one amidships; two more torpedoes hit through thick smoke. The bow of Ashigara was blown off, the fo'c'sle deck smashed and the ship set on fire.

Trenchant's company queued to view through the search periscope but it was seen and fired on by Ashigara's anti-aircraft gunners. Hezlet then turned Trenchant to bring her stern tubes to bear and fired two more torpedoes at 12:24 a.m. that missed. Torpedoes from Ashigara aimed at Trenchant's periscope also missed. The fire caused by the first hits had spread rapidly through Ashigara, causing a huge pall of smoke which obscured Hezlet's view. Kamikaze had returned to the area and dropped three patterns of depth charges but these were no closer than 3 mi (2.6 nmi; 4.8 km) from Trenchant. Ashigara capsized to starboard at 12:39 a.m. at 1° 59' S 104° 57' E and Kamikaze began to rescue survivors, assisted by two local vessels. Trenchant remained submerged and escaped to the north of Bangka Strait, returning to Subic Bay, Philippines on 20 June 1945, followed by Stygian on 27 June 1945.

== Aftermath ==
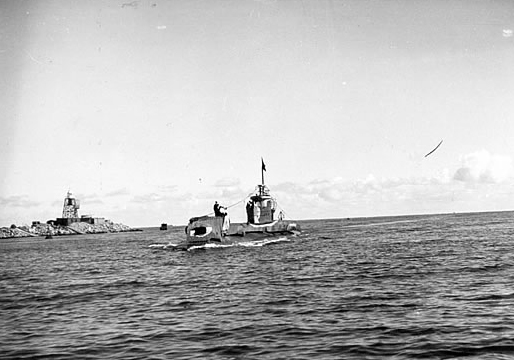
HMS Trenchant flying the Jolly Roger after sinking Ashigara

Japanese losses in the sinking were severe, out of 1,600 troops, only 400 were rescued along with 850 of her crew, including Captain Miura and Vice-Admiral Hashimoto, the commander of the 5th Cruiser Squadron. Ashigara had been the last big Japanese warship in the area, after the cruiser Haguro was sunk during the Battle of the Malacca Strait a month earlier, by British destroyers. After her sinking, Kamikaze remained the only efficient ship left to the Tenth Area Fleet. The Tenth Area Command remained, Vice-Admiral Shin'ichi Ichise, left to command nothing more than minesweepers, anti-submarine ships and small craft. The sinking of Ashigara earned Hezlet a bar to his DSO and the U.S. Legion of Merit. Trenchant flew the Jolly Roger as a tribute to her success when she reached her base at Trincomalee. In 1965, Richard Compton-Hall described the sinking Ashigara at such long range, from a tactically awkward position, a considerable achievement.

== See also ==
- List by death toll of ships sunk by submarines

== Bibliography ==
- Compton-Hall, Richard (1965). Submarines at War 1939–45. Periscope Publishing. ISBN 978-1-904381-22-8.
- Helgason, Guðmundur (2023). "HMS Stygian (P 249)". uboat.net.
- Jackson, Ashley; Wells, Linton (2006). The British Empire and the Second World War. Hambledon Continuum. ISBN 1-85285-417-0.
- Lacroix, Eric; Wells, Linton (1997). Japanese Cruisers of the Pacific War. Naval Institute Press. ISBN 0-87021-311-3.
- McCartney, Innes (2006). British Submarines 1939–45. New Vanguard (No.129). Oxford: Osprey. ISBN 978-1-84603-007-9.
- Rohwer, Jürgen; Hümmelchen, Gerhard (2005) [1972]. Chronology of the War at Sea, 1939–1945: The Naval History of World War Two (3rd rev. ed.). London: Chatham. ISBN 978-1-86176-257-3.
- War with Japan: The Advance to Japan. Vol. VI. London: HMSO (Ministry of Defence Naval Historical Branch). 1995. ISBN 0-11-772821-7.
- Winton, John (2022) [1993]. Ultra in the Pacific: How Breaking Japanese Codes and Ciphers affected Naval Operations against Japan 1941–45 (e-book repr. Sapere Books, Leeds ed.). Annapolis, MD: Naval Institute Press. ISBN 978-1-80055-498-6.
- Wise, James (2003). Soldiers Lost at Sea: A Chronicle of Troopship Disasters. Naval Institute Press. ISBN 978-1-59114-966-8 – via Archive Foundation.
