= HMAS Colac =

Bathurst-class corvette of the Royal Australian Navy

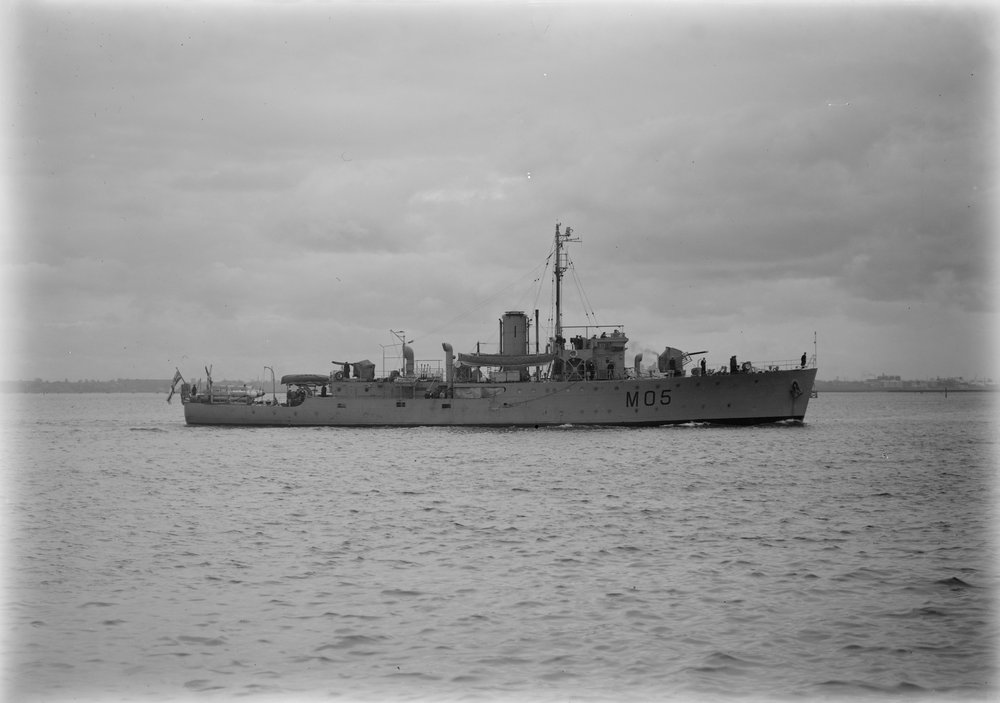
- HMAS Colac in 1952

History

Australia
- Namesake: Town of Colac, Victoria
- Builder: Mort's Dock and Engineering Company
- Laid down: 18 April 1941
- Launched: 30 August 1941
- Commissioned: 6 January 1942
- Decommissioned: 27 November 1945
- Recommissioned: 20 February 1951
- Decommissioned: 30 January 1953
- Out of service: 1983
- Reclassified: Training ship (1951–1953); Tank cleaning ship (1962–1983)
- Honours and awards: Battle honours: Pacific 1942–45; New Guinea 1942–44
- Fate: Torpedoed by HMAS Ovens on 4 March 1987 in a weapons test
- Badge

General characteristics
- Class & type: Bathurst-class corvette
- Displacement: 650 tons standard; 1,025 tons full load
- Length: 186 ft (57 m)
- Beam: 31 ft (9.4 m)
- Draught: 8.5 ft (2.6 m)
- Propulsion: triple expansion engine, 2 shafts, 2,000 hp
- Speed: 15 knots (28 km/h; 17 mph) at 1,750 hp
- Complement: 85
- Armament: 1 × 12-pounder gun (later replaced by 1 × 4 inch Mk XIX gun); 3 × Oerlikon 20 mm cannons; 1 × Bofors 40 mm Automatic Gun L/60 (installed later); Machine guns; Depth charges chutes and throwers

HMAS Colac (J242/M05), named for the town of Colac, Victoria, was one of 60 Bathurst-class corvettes constructed during World War II, and one of 36 initially manned and commissioned solely by the Royal Australian Navy (RAN).

== Design and construction ==
In 1938, the Australian Commonwealth Naval Board (ACNB) identified the need for a general purpose 'local defence vessel' capable of both anti-submarine and mine-warfare duties, while easy to construct and operate. The vessel was initially envisaged as having a displacement of approximately 500 tons, a speed of at least 10 knots (19 km/h; 12 mph), and a range of 2,000 nautical miles (3,700 km; 2,300 mi) The opportunity to build a prototype in the place of a cancelled Bar-class boom defence vessel saw the proposed design increased to a 680-ton vessel, with a 15.5 knots (28.7 km/h; 17.8 mph) top speed, and a range of 2,850 nautical miles (5,280 km; 3,280 mi), armed with a 4-inch gun, equipped with asdic, and able to fitted with either depth charges or minesweeping equipment depending on the planned operations: although closer in size to a sloop than a local defence vessel, the resulting increased capabilities were accepted due to advantages over British-designed mine warfare and anti-submarine vessels. Construction of the prototype HMAS Kangaroo did not go ahead, but the plans were retained. The need for locally built 'all-rounder' vessels at the start of World War II saw the "Australian Minesweepers" (designated as such to hide their anti-submarine capability, but popularly referred to as "corvettes") approved in September 1939, with 60 constructed during the course of the war: 36 (including Colac) ordered by the RAN, 20 ordered by the British Admiralty but manned and commissioned as RAN vessels, and 4 for the Royal Indian Navy.

Colac was laid down by Mort's Dock and Engineering Company at Balmain, New South Wales on 18 April 1941. She was launched on 30 August 1941 by Miss M. Heady, senior lady on the staff of Morts Dock and Engineering, and commissioned into the RAN on 6 January 1942. The Colac was under the command of Lt. Commander Dudley Charles Northam. The ship was originally to be named HMAS Hamilton.

== Operational history ==
=== World War II ===
After entering service, Colac was assigned as an anti-submarine patrol and convoy escort vessel, operating between Townsville and New Guinea. This continued until December 1942, when Colac and sister ships Ballarat and Broome were ordered to support the Allied efforts to recapture Buna-Gona by embarking 762 Australian soldiers and delivering them as far into the Japanese-occupied Oro Province of Papua New Guinea as possible. The first attempt, early on 14 December, saw 46 soldiers landed at Cape Sudest before the three corvettes were attacked by Japanese aircraft and forced to withdraw. That night, under the cover of darkness, the remaining troops were landed nearby. Throughout December, Colac was involved in three similar troop deployments, and later took part in Operation Lilliput; the reinforcement and supply of the captured area.

In March 1943, Colac and Ballarat were reassigned to convoy escort duty along the east coast of Australia. On 26 April, a five-ship convoy escorted by the two corvettes was attacked by Japanese submarine I-177 off Cape Byron. The MV Limerick was torpedoed and sunk, with all but two of the crew rescued by Colac. I-177 escaped unharmed. In July, Colac was instructed to begin escorting convoys between Australia and New Guinea, before returning to east coast convoys at the start of 1944, then undergoing a refit.

In April 1944, Colac was assigned to escort and patrol duties in New Guinea waters, which continued until April 1945, when the corvette was one of four RAN ships providing gunfire support for operations in the Wewak area. In mid-May, Colac was assigned to harass Japanese bases in the Solomon Islands area. On 26 May, the ship suffered her first casualties of the war, two hits from Japanese shore batteries killed two sailors, wounded two others, and holed Colac at the waterline. The corvette jettisoned stores, her depth charge payload, and replaceable pieces of equipment to avoid sinking and escape, and later limped to the Treasury Islands under tow for repairs. Temporary repairs were made to allow Colac to sail to New Guinea and then to Sydney, where she arrived on 18 June and entered dock for repairs. Colac was still under repair when World War II ended, and she was paid off into reserve on 27 November 1945.

The corvette was awarded two battle honours for her wartime service: "Pacific 1942–45" and "New Guinea 1942–44".

=== Training ship ===
On 20 February 1951, Colac was recommissioned for use as a training ship for National Service trainees.

== Decommissioning and fate ==
Colac was returned to reserve on 30 January 1953. In 1962, the ship was converted into a tank cleaning vessel, and served in this role until 30 September 1983. Colac was not recommissioned during this time.

On 4 March 1987, Colac was sunk by a Mark 48 torpedo fired by the submarine HMAS Ovens in a weapons test. The corvette sank at 34°49.2′S 151°32′E.
