= South Point (Wilsons Promontory) =

Southernmost point of the Australian mainland

Coordinates: 39°08′11″S 146°22′29″E

Extreme points of mainland Australia

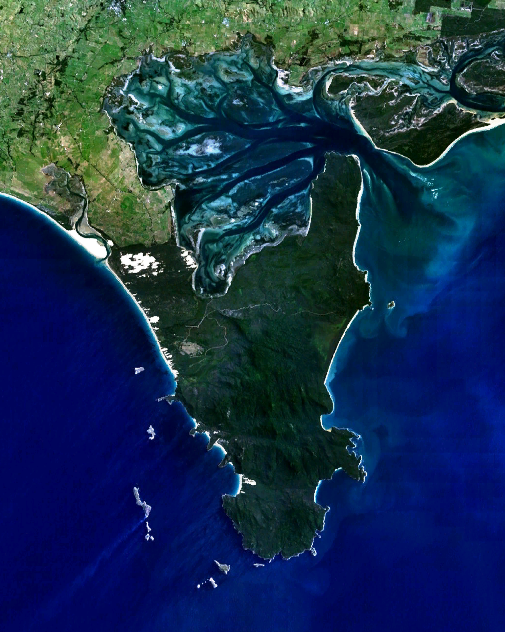
Wilsons Promontory with South Point at bottom

This is an article about South Point on Wilsons Promontory, Victoria, Australia; see also South Point (disambiguation)

South Point is the southernmost point of the Australian mainland. It is at the tip of Wilsons Promontory in the state of Victoria and is part of Wilsons Promontory National Park.

== See also ==
- List of extreme points of Australia
- Cape York, the northernmost point on the Australian mainland
- Cape Byron, the easternmost point on the Australian mainland
- Steep Point, westernmost point on the Australian mainland
