= HMS Opossum (S19) =

Submarine of the Royal Navy

- HMS Opossum (S19)

History

United Kingdom
- Name: HMS Opossum
- Builder: Cammell Laird, Birkenhead
- Laid down: 21 December 1961
- Launched: 23 May 1963
- Commissioned: 5 June 1964
- Decommissioned: August 1993
- Fate: Paid off for disposal

General characteristics as designed
- Class & type: Oberon class
- Displacement: 1,610 tons standard; 2,030 tons full load surfaced; 2,410 tons full load submerged
- Length: 241 feet (73 m) between perpendiculars; 295.2 feet (90.0 m) length overall
- Beam: 26.5 feet (8.1 m)
- Draught: 18 feet (5.5 m)
- Propulsion: 2 × Admiralty Standard Range 16 VMS diesel generators; 2 × 3,000 shaft horsepower (2,200 kW) electric motors; 2 shafts
- Speed: 17 knots (31 km/h; 20 mph) submerged; 12 knots (22 km/h; 14 mph) surfaced
- Complement: 68
- Sensors & processing systems: Type 186 and Type 187 sonars; I-band surface search radar
- Armament: 8 × 21-inch (530 mm) torpedo tubes (6 forward, 2 aft); 24 torpedoes

HMS Opossum (S19) was an Oberon-class submarine in service with the Royal Navy from 1964 to 1993.

== Design and construction ==
The Oberon class was a direct follow-on of the Porpoise-class, with the same dimensions and external design, but updates to equipment and internal fittings, and a higher grade of steel used for fabrication of the pressure hull.

As designed for British service, the Oberon-class submarines were 241 feet (73 m) in length between perpendiculars and 295.2 feet (90.0 m) in length overall, with a beam of 26.5 feet (8.1 m), and a draught of 18 feet (5.5 m). Displacement was 1,610 tons standard, 2,030 tons full load when surfaced, and 2,410 tons full load when submerged. Propulsion machinery consisted of 2 Admiralty Standard Range 16 VMS diesel generators, and two 3,000 shaft horsepower (2,200 kW) electric motors, each driving a 7-foot diameter (2.1 m) 3-bladed propeller at up to 400 rpm. Top speed was 17 knots (31 km/h; 20 mph) when submerged, and 12 knots (22 km/h; 14 mph) on the surface. Eight 21-inch (530 mm) diameter torpedo tubes were fitted (six facing forward, two aft), with a total payload of 24 torpedoes. The boats were fitted with Type 186 and Type 187 sonars, and an I-band surface search radar. The standard complement was 68: 6 officers, 62 sailors.

Opossum was laid down by Cammell Laird on 21 December 1961, and launched on 23 May 1963. The boat was commissioned into the Royal Navy on 5 June 1964.

== Operational history ==
In 1990, Opossum took part in the bicentennial celebrations at Pitcairn Island, marking the occasion with a two-day visit in September.

Opossum was deployed to the Persian Gulf during the 1991 Gulf War under Operation Granby. On her return to Gosport, she was flying a Jolly Roger; the only indication that the submarine had been involved in deploying and recovering Special Air Service and Special Boat Service personnel.

On 14 July 1993, Opossum (which was travelling on the surface at the time) collided with the fishing vessel Amber Rose off the coast of Scotland.

== Decommissioning and fate ==
On paying off in 1993, the nameplate from Opossum was given to St Edmundsbury council in commemoration of the submarine's association with the town of Bury St. Edmunds.

== Heraldry ==
Admiral of the Fleet Lord Boyce, who commanded Opossum as a lieutenant commander from 1974 to 1976, symbolically commemorated the submarine in his personal coat of arms. For his crest he chose "a Mouse Opossum Argent, the eye ring and claws Azure", while his heraldic motto is "Ipsis Fretis Impedimentis Possum". (illustration)

== Publications ==
- Colledge, J. J.; Warlow, Ben (2006) [1969]. Ships of the Royal Navy: The Complete Record of All Fighting Ships of the Royal Navy from the 15th Century to the Present (3rd Rev ed.). London: Chatham Publishing. ISBN 978-1-86176-281-8. OCLC 67375475.
