= MV Limerick =

History

New Zealand
- Name: Limerick
- Owner: Union Steamship Company
- Builder: William Hamilton & Co, Glasgow
- Yard number: 389
- Launched: 12 March 1925
- Out of service: 26 April 1943
- Identification: Official Number: 148634
- Fate: Sunk 26 April 1943

General characteristics
- Type: Cargo ship
- Tonnage: 8,724 GRT
- Length: 460 ft 0 in (140.21 m)
- Beam: 62 ft 6 in (19.05 m)
- Draught: 37 ft 9 in (11.51 m)
- Installed power: 6,000 bhp (4,500 kW)
- Propulsion: 2 x Brown Sulzer Diesel engines
- Speed: 13.5 knots (25.0 km/h; 15.5 mph)
- Crew: 74

MV Limerick was an 8,724-gross register ton (GRT) refrigerated cargo ship built by William Hamilton & Co, Glasgow in 1925 for the Union Steamship Company of New Zealand.

== Fate ==
While sailing in convoy GP 48 along the east coast of Australia, protected by the Royal Australian Navy corvettes HMAS Colac and Ballarat, Limerick was torpedoed and sunk on 26 April 1943, by the Japanese submarine I-177 off Cape Byron. All but two of the crew were rescued by Colac. I-177 escaped unharmed.

== Wreck ==
The wreck of the Limerick lies in 100 metres (330 ft) of water, about 18 kilometres (11 mi) east of Ballina. Discovered by local anglers, the wreck's identity was officially confirmed on 2 February 2013, when it was mapped by the marine research vessel Southern Surveyor.
