= HMS Trenchant (P331) =

Royal Navy T class submarine in service 1944-1963

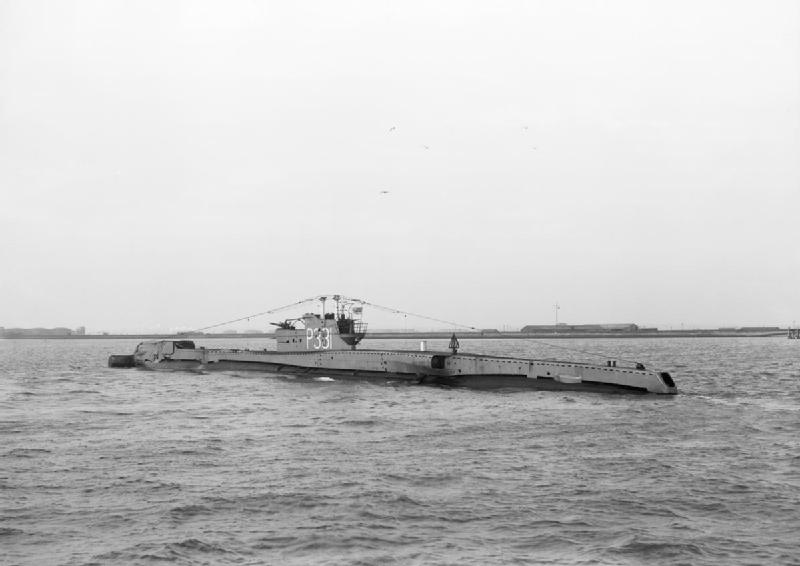
- HMS Trenchant

History

United Kingdom
- Name: Trenchant
- Builder: Chatham Dockyard
- Laid down: 9 May 1942
- Launched: 24 March 1943
- Commissioned: 26 February 1944
- Fate: Sold to be broken up for scrap on 1 July 1963. Scrapped at Faslane
- Badge

General characteristics
- Class & type: British T class submarine
- Displacement: 1,290 tons surfaced; 1,560 tons submerged
- Length: 276 ft 6 in (84.28 m)
- Beam: 25 ft 6 in (7.77 m)
- Draught: 12 ft 9 in (3.89 m) forward; 14 ft 7 in (4.45 m) aft
- Propulsion: Two shafts; Twin diesel engines 2,500 hp (1.86 MW) each; Twin electric motors 1,450 hp (1.08 MW) each
- Speed: 15.5 knots (28.7 km/h) surfaced; 9 knots (20 km/h) submerged
- Range: 4,500 nautical miles at 11 knots (8,330 km at 20 km/h) surfaced
- Test depth: 300 ft (91 m) max
- Complement: 61
- Armament: 6 internal forward-facing 21 inch (533 mm) torpedo tubes; 2 external forward-facing torpedo tubes; 2 external amidships rear-facing torpedo tubes; 1 external rear-facing torpedo tube; 6 reload torpedoes; QF 4 inch (100 mm) deck gun; 3 anti aircraft machine guns

HMS Trenchant (P331) was a British T class submarine of the Second World War built at Chatham Dockyard.

On completion she was given over to the crew of HMS Thrasher whose submarine was due for a refit.

== Service ==
Trenchant under her captain Commander Arthur Hezlet, DSO, DSC acted in the Far East mostly off South East Asia against Japanese shipping sinking a range of vessels both transports and warships, using her torpedoes, gun and also by ramming. She often operated in company with her sister, HMS Terrapin.

On 23 September 1944 she sank the German submarine U-859 in the Straits of Malacca, by torpedoes. 11 of the crew were taken aboard as prisoners of war.

On 27 October 1944, "Chariots" carried into action by Trenchant sank a Japanese Army cargo ship, the Sumatra Maru in Phuket harbour, Siam.

Her most significant action during the war was on 8 June 1945, when she sank the Japanese cruiser Ashigara at a range of 4,000 yards with five out of eight torpedoes fired. The action in the Bangka Straits earned her commander a second DSO and the US Legion of Merit, and the ship the battle honour "Malaya 1944-45". The Ashigara had been carrying some 1,600 Japanese Army troops and materiel.
