= South Point, Lexington =

South Point
- Neighborhood of Lexington, Kentucky
- Interactive map of South Point
- Coordinates: 37.964°N 84.529°W
- Country: United States
- State: Kentucky
- County: Fayette
- City: Lexington

Area
  - Total: .308 sq mi (0.80 km^{2})
  - Water: 0 sq mi (0.0 km^{2})

Population (2000)
  - Total: 1,219
  - Density: 3,956/sq mi (1,527/km^{2})
- Time zone: UTC-5 (Eastern (EST))
  - Summer (DST): UTC-4 (EDT)
- ZIP code: 40515
- Area code: 859

South Point is a neighborhood in southeastern Lexington, Kentucky, United States. Its boundaries are Nicholasville Road to the west, the Jessamine County line to the south, the newer Waterford neighborhood to the east, and Waveland Museum Lane to the north.

== Neighborhood statistics ==
- Area: 0.308 square miles (0.80 km^{2})
- Population: 1,219
- Population density: 3,956 people per square mile
- Median household income (2010): $80,413
