= South Point (shopping mall) =

Shopping mall in McDonough, Georgia, United States

South Point Mall
- Location: McDonough, Georgia
- Coordinates: 33.42333°N 84.18862°W
- Opened: 2008
- Developer: South Point Retail Partners
- Manager: South Point Retail Partners
- Owner: South Point Retail Partners
- Num. of stores: 57
- Num. of anchor tenants: 9 (when complete)
- Floor area: 600,000 sq ft (56,000 m^{2})
- Parking: 2,758
- Website: southpointretail.com

South Point is a shopping center in McDonough, Georgia. The mall opened in 2008 with JCPenney and Kohl's. Hobby Lobby and Hilton Garden Inn joined the tenant mix in 2009 and shortly after Academy Sports + Outdoors. Since opening their doors, these stores have repeatedly ranked as top performing in the region, drawing shoppers from as far away as 30 miles (48 km).

TJ Maxx, Toys "R" Us and Haverty's were all confirmed and opened as anchors in 2012. Other stores that opened over the past couple years include Ulta Beauty, Party City, and Five Below. Rooms to Go began construction in the 4th quarter of 2013 and have plans to open by the late summer of 2014. Freddy’s announced that they would be building a new restaurant in the center with a planned opening of May 2014.
