= Cape Byron =

Easternmost point of mainland Australia

- Cape
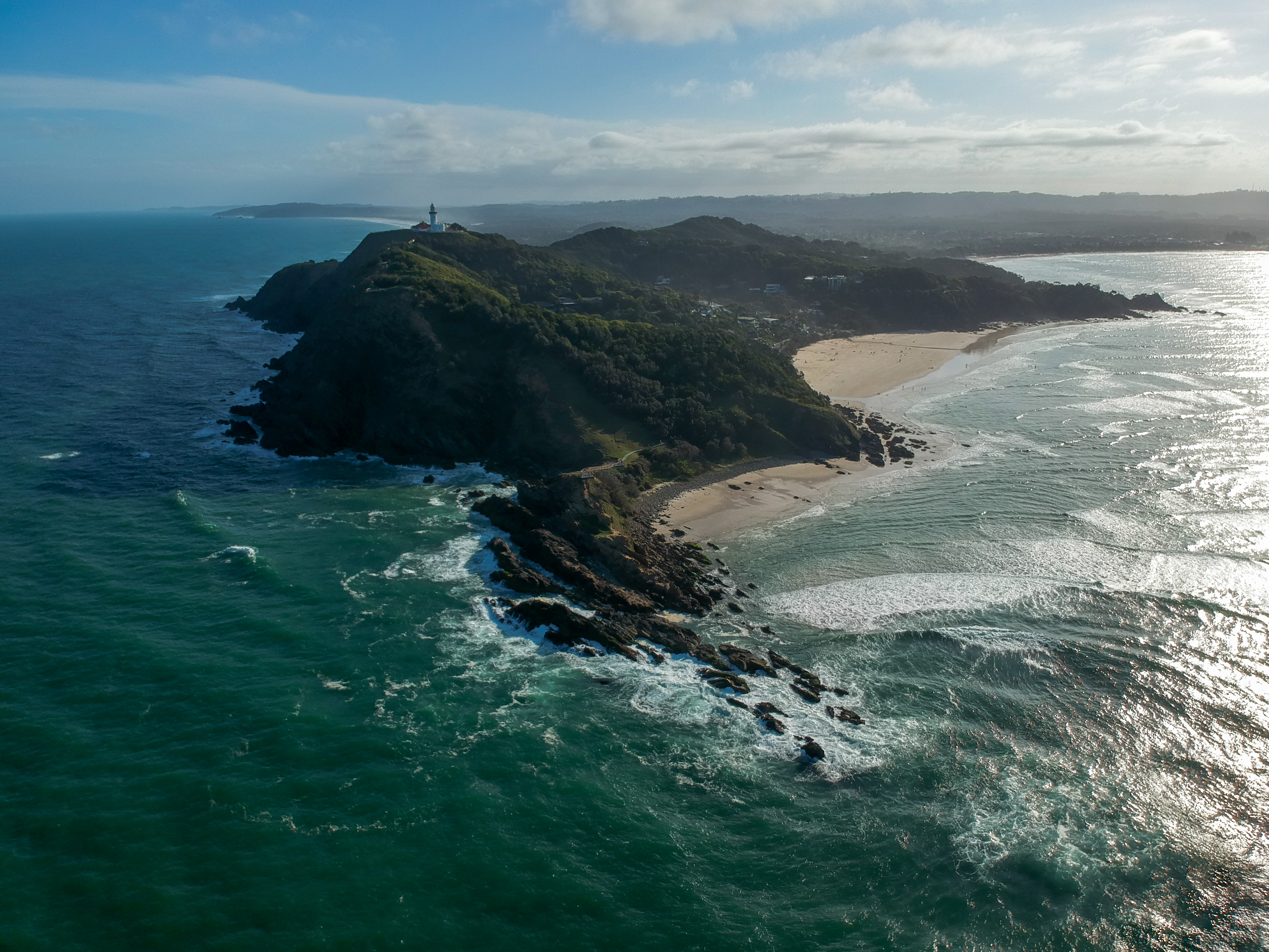

- Location within New South Wales
- Coordinates: 28.632778°S 153.638889°E
- Location: Byron Bay, NSW
- Water bodies: Tasman Sea

Cape Byron is the easternmost point of the mainland of Australia, located in New South Wales. It is about 3 km (1.9 mi) east of the town of Byron Bay, New South Wales and projects into the Pacific Ocean at 28.6335° S, 153.6383° E. A lighthouse is situated there. It is a popular area for hiking and for whale watching. Two national parks, one a conservation area and a marine park, are on the bay.

Cape Byron has a significant influences on the open beaches to its north. Longshore drift transports sand northwards. Sand blocked by the cape drops off the continental shelf, which is very narrow here, at a rate of around 50,000 cubic metres of sand per year.

== History ==
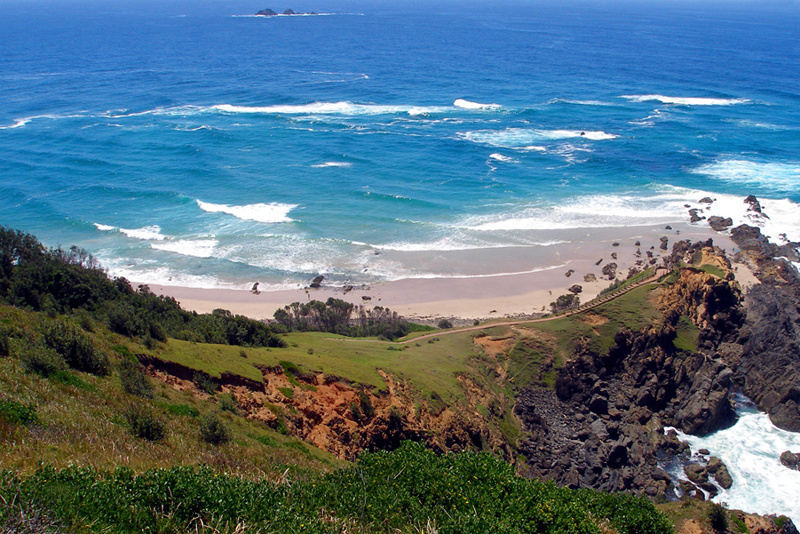
Cape Byron, easternmost point of the Australian mainland

The cape was named by British explorer Captain James Cook, when he passed the area on 15 May 1770, to honour British explorer John Byron who circumnavigated the globe in HMS Dolphin from 1764 to 1766.

The MV Limerick was sunk off Cape Byron in 1943.

The Cape is part of the Cape Byron State Conservation Area.

== Cape Byron Light ==
Built in 1901, the Cape Byron Lighthouse is the last of the great 19th-century Victorian era lighthouses managed by the National Parks and Wildlife Service (NPWS). It is constructed from concrete blocks and stands on the most easterly point of the Australian mainland.

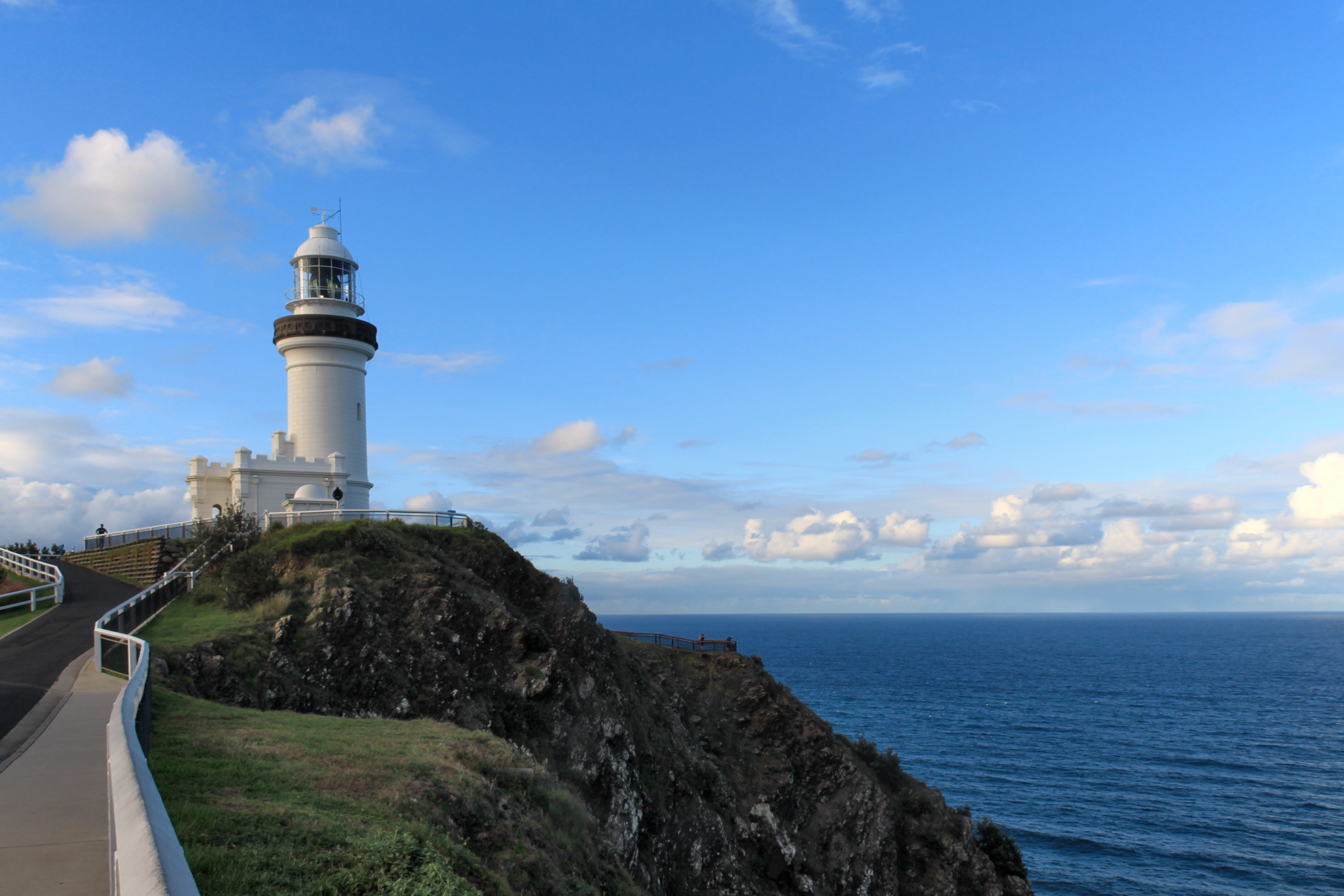
The Cape Byron Lighthouse

== Cape Byron walking track ==
The Cape Byron walking track winds through the Cape Byron State Conservation Area. The 3.7 kilometres (2.3 mi) loop walk can be started at any point with parking available at Captain Cook Lookout, Palm Valley, Wategos Beach and the Lighthouse.

== Cape Byron Marine Park ==
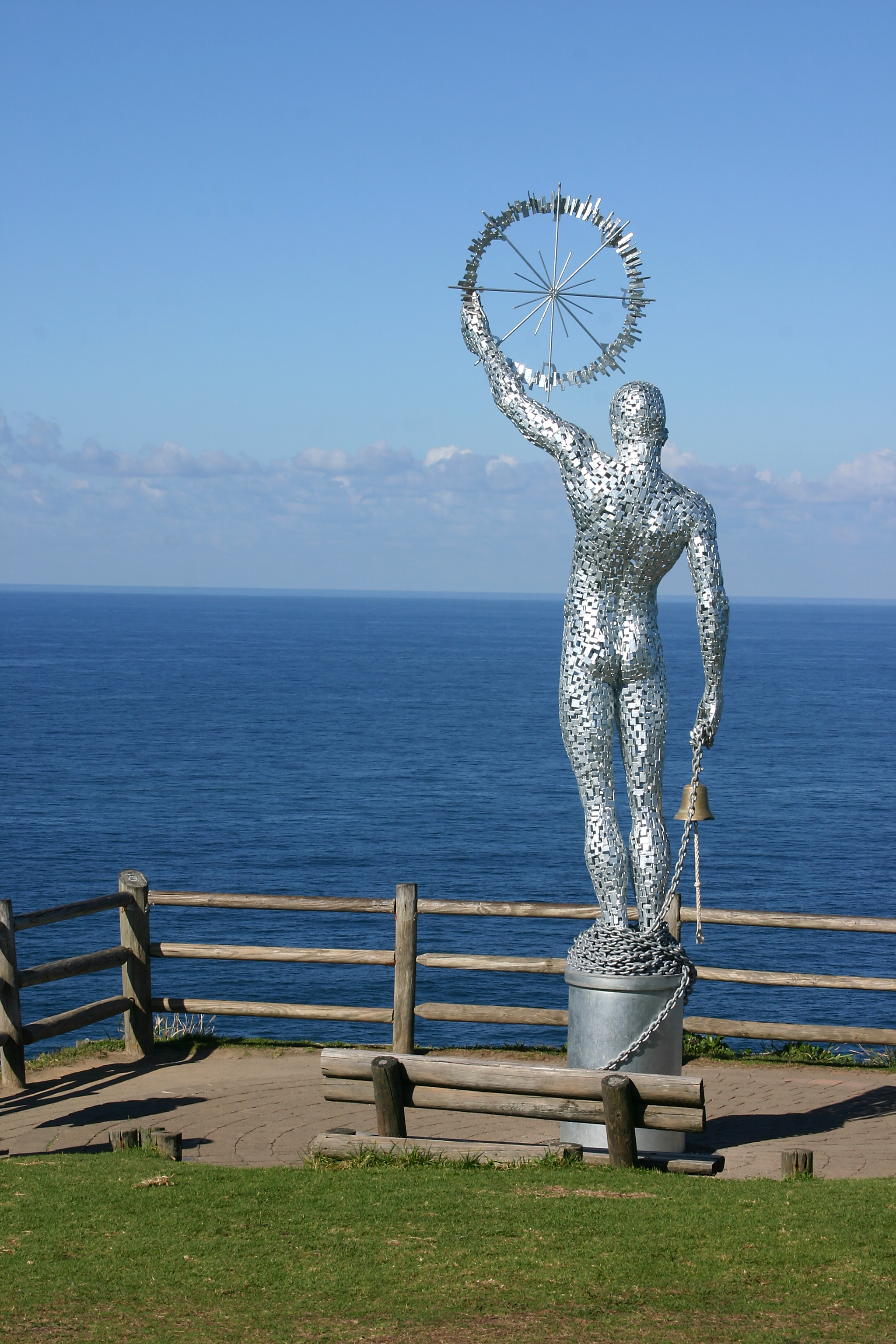
Statue overlooking Cape Byron

Cape Byron is part of the 22,000 hectare Cape Byron Marine Park, which was established in November 2002. The area is also noted for its wildlife, with the whale watching industry a significant contributor to the local economy. The park extends from Lennox Head in the south to northern bank of the Brunswick River mouth.

Cape Byron Marine Park is a multiple-use marine park which includes protected areas where fishing and collecting are prohibited, and general-use areas which support both commercial and recreational fishing. It extends from the Brunswick River to Lennox Head, and from mean high water out to three nautical miles from the coast or islands. It includes the tidal waters of the Brunswick River, Belongil and Tallow creeks. Migrating whales can typically be seen swimming past the Cape.

== Extreme points ==
Australia has several other extreme points. These are Cape York, the northernmost point on the Australian mainland, South Point, the southernmost point on the Australian mainland, Steep Point, the westernmost point on the Australian mainland and Mount Kosciuszko, the uppermost point on the Australian mainland.

== See also ==
- List of Australian places named by James Cook
