= Use of the Jolly Roger by submarines =

Naval tradition

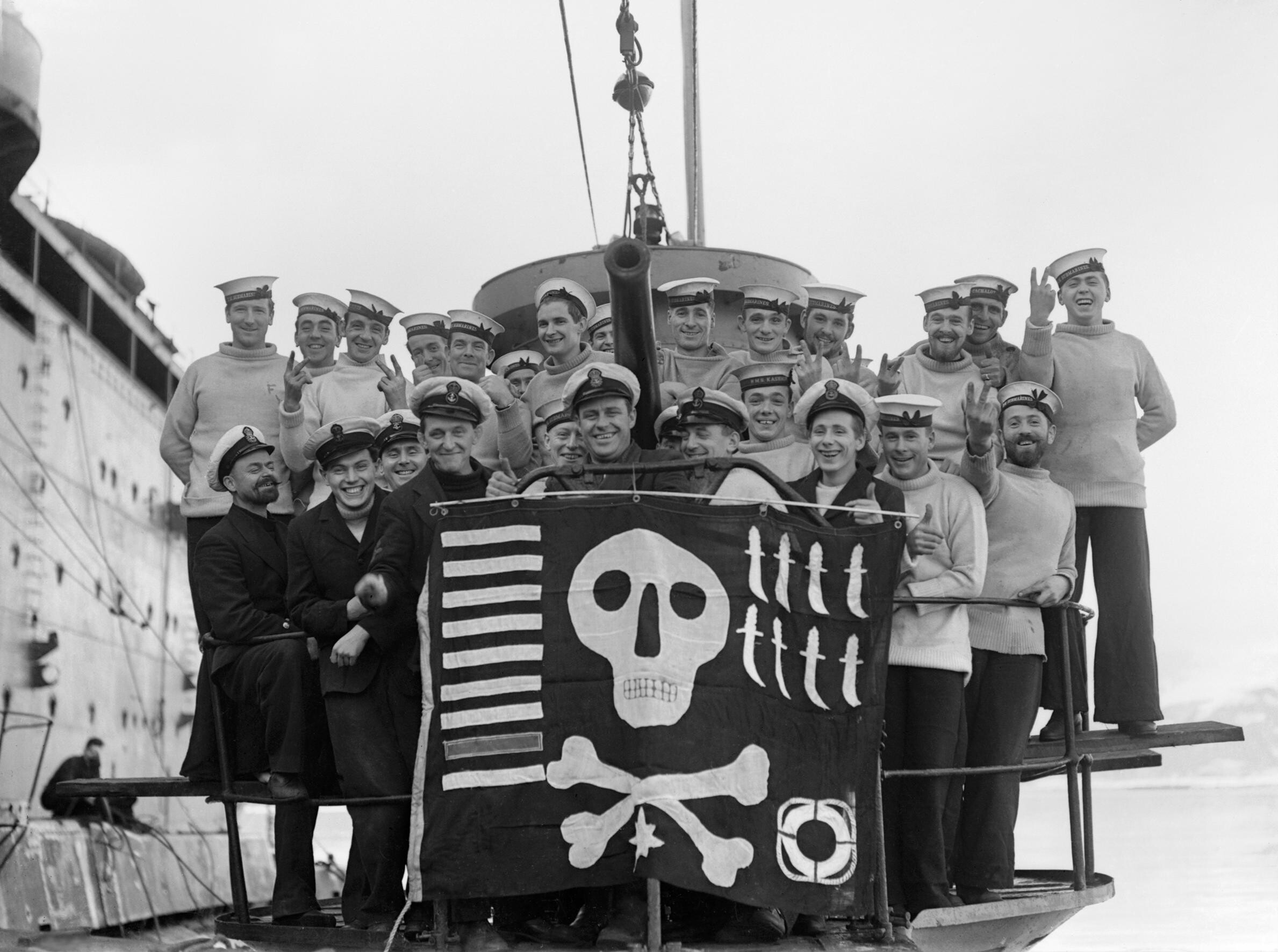
The personnel of the British submarine HMS Utmost showing off their Jolly Roger in February 1942. The markings on the flag indicate the boat's achievements: nine ships torpedoed (including one warship), eight 'cloak and dagger' operations, one target destroyed by gunfire, and one at-sea rescue

The Jolly Roger is a symbol that has been used by submarines, primarily those of the Royal Navy Submarine Service and its predecessors. The practice came about during World War I: remembering a 1901 complaint by Admiral Sir Arthur Wilson that submarines were "underhanded, unfair, and damned un-English" and that submarine personnel should be hanged as pirates, Lieutenant Commander Max Horton began flying the flag after returning from successful patrols. Initially, Horton's submarine HMS E9 flew an additional flag after each successful patrol, but when there was no room for more, the practice was changed to a single large flag, onto which symbols indicating the submarine's achievements were sewn.

The practice of flying the Jolly Roger was adopted by some other submarines during World War I, but became more widespread in World War II. Flotilla commanders began to issue flags to submarines, and procedures were drafted for usage. Although some sources report the use of the flag being a universal practice among British submariners, some submarine captains did not take it up as they felt the practice was boastful and the achievements could not always be confirmed. Usage of the Jolly Roger was copied by some Allied submarines during World War II, and the flag has also been used by submarines from other Commonwealth nations.

The symbols on a Jolly Roger are used to indicate the achievements of the submarine. Bars represented ships torpedoed, although post-war flags have sometimes used the silhouette of the target ship instead. Mines indicated minelaying operations, while torches or lighthouses meant the boat had been used as a navigation marker for an operation. More unusual symbols have also been used, with comic character Eugene the Jeep marking the recovery of a Chariot manned torpedo, and a dog used for submarines involved in Operation Husky. Some icons are unique to a submarine: HMS Sibyl bears a scarlet pimpernel flower, marking the time a French spy forgot the recognition password and instead quoted from the play The Scarlet Pimpernel to prove herself, while a stork and baby was added to the Jolly Roger of HMS United when news of the birth of the captain's first child arrived while on patrol.

== History ==
Following the introduction of submarines in several European navies, Admiral Sir Arthur Wilson, the First Sea Lord of the Royal Navy, complained in 1901 that submarines were "underhanded, unfair, and damned un-English" and stated he would convince the Admiralty to have the crews of enemy submarines captured during wartime be hanged as pirates.

In September 1914, the British submarine HMS E9 successfully torpedoed the German cruiser SMS Hela. Remembering Wilson's statement, commanding officer Lieutenant Commander Max Horton instructed his signaller to manufacture a Jolly Roger, which was flown from the submarine as she entered port. Each successful patrol saw Horton's submarine fly an additional Jolly Roger until there was no more room for flags, at which point Horton had a large Jolly Roger manufactured, onto which bars indicating the ships E9 sunk were sewn. A small number of other submarines adopted the practice: HMS E12 flew a red flag with the skull and crossbones on return from a foray into the Dardanelles in June 1915, and the first known photograph of the practice was taken in July 1916 aboard HMS H5. The Admiralty disapproved of the practice, but was unable to stop it.

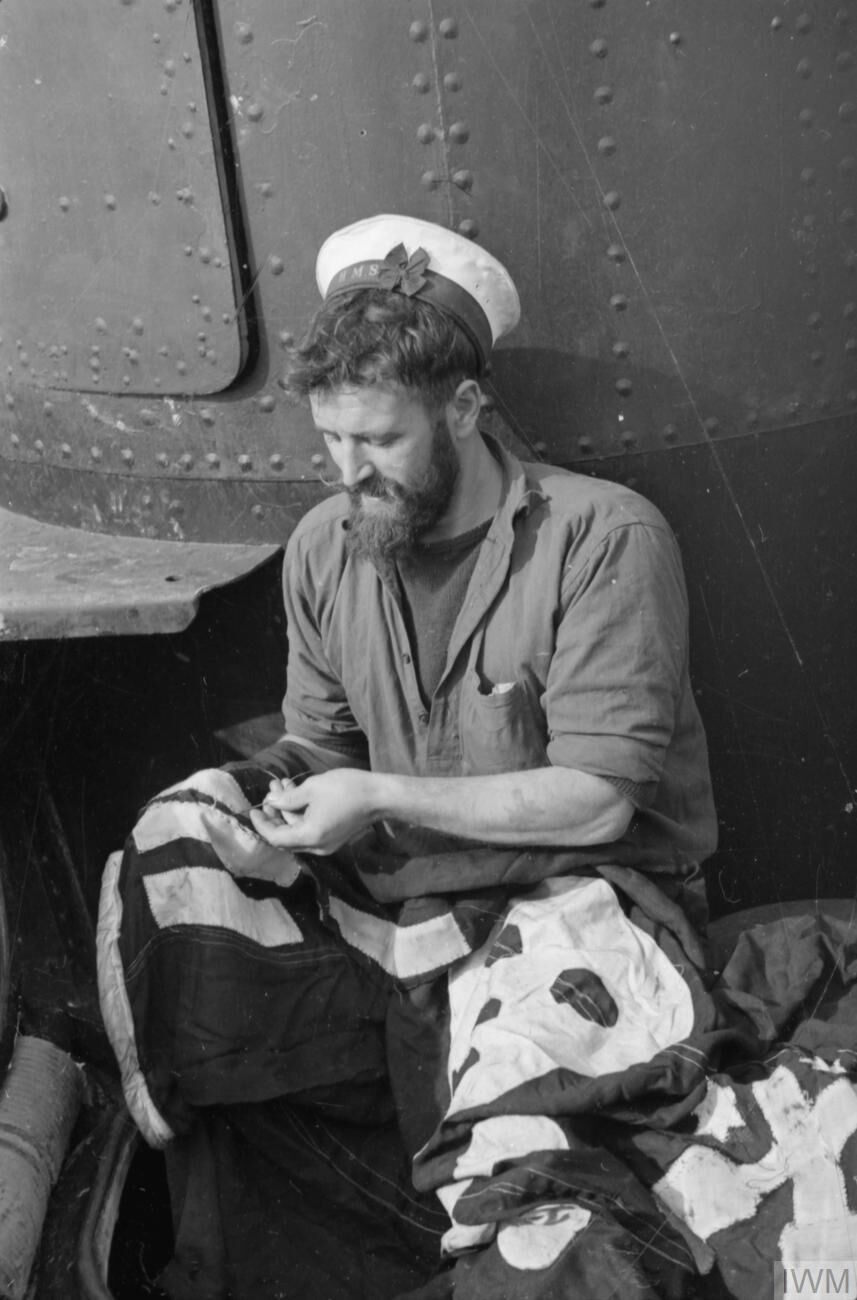
A submariner from HMS Taku making additions to the boat's Jolly Roger

The practice restarted during World War II. In October 1941, following a successful patrol by HMS Osiris, during which she sank the Italian destroyer Palestro the submarine returned to Alexandria, but was ordered to remain outside the boom net until the motorboat assigned to the leader of the 1st Submarine Flotilla had come alongside and delivered a "special recognition signal". The flotilla leader wanted to recognise the boat's achievement, which had involved penetrating deep into the heavily guarded Adriatic, so had a Jolly Roger made and delivered to Osiris. (Note: Some accounts state that Horton, now Commander-in-Chief Submarines, was visiting at the time of Osiris' return, and influenced the flotilla leader's decision.) After this, the commanders of submarine flotillas began to issue the flags to submarines following the boat's first successful patrol. (Note: What constitutes a "successful patrol" is not made clear, but likely includes the sinking of a ship) Once handed over, it became the responsibility of the boat's personnel to maintain the flag and update it with new symbols indicating the submarine's achievements. A submarine was entitled to fly the flag when returning from a successful patrol: it would be hoisted as the submarine passed the boom net, lowered at sunset, and could not be flown again until another successful patrol had occurred. The Jolly Roger could also be flown on the day a submarine returned to the UK from a successful overseas deployment. Although some sources claim that all British submarines used the flag, the practice was not taken up by those submarine commanders who saw it as boastful and potentially inaccurate, as sinkings could not always be confirmed.

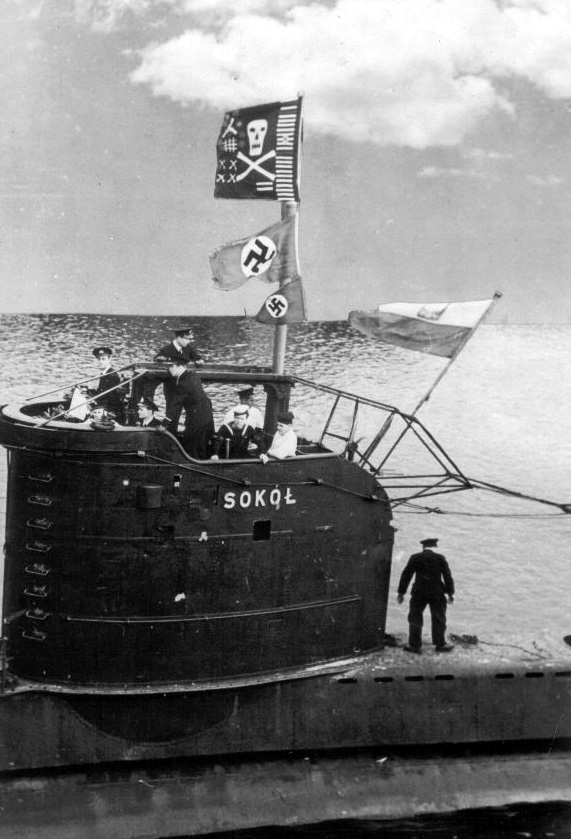
The Polish submarine ORP Sokół returning to base in 1944. A Jolly Roger flag and two captured Nazi flags are flying from the periscope mast

Flying the Jolly Roger continued in the late 20th century and on into the 21st. HMS Conqueror raised the flag to recognise her successful attack on the Argentine cruiser ARA General Belgrano during the Falklands War. HMS Conqueror's Jolly Roger, now in the Royal Navy Submarine Museum, featured an atom for being the only nuclear submarine with a kill, crossed torpedoes for the type of weapon used, a dagger indicating a cloak-and-dagger operation, and the outline of a cruiser for what kind of ship was sunk.

Unmarked Jolly Rogers were flown by HMS Opossum and HMS Otus on their return from deployments during the Gulf War: this was suspected to indicate the deployment of Special Air Service and Special Boat Service forces from the submarines. Several submarines returning from missions where Tomahawk cruise missiles were fired fly Jolly Rogers with tomahawk axes depicted, with crossed tomahawks indicating an unspecified number of firings, or individual axes for each successful launch. The Jolly Roger has been adopted as the logo of the Royal Navy Submarine Service.

== Use by other navies ==
The practice, while commonly associated with British submarines, is not restricted to them. During World War II, Allied submariners working with Royal Navy fleets adopted the process from their British counterparts. While operating in the Mediterranean, the Polish submarines ORP Sokół and ORP Dzik were presented with Jolly Rogers by General Władysław Sikorski, and continued to update them during the war.

At least one British surface ship recorded their U-boat kills through silhouettes on a Jolly Roger. The Royal Australian Navy has also flown the Jolly Roger from submarines on occasion. Following the first Australian live firing of a Mark 48 torpedo in 1987, HMAS Ovens used the flag to indicate the successful sinking of the target ship Colac. HMAS Onslow flew the Jolly Roger in 1980, following her successful participation in the Kangaroo 3 wargame as an opposing submarine: the flag bore the silhouettes of the seven surface ships involved, as during the exercise, Onslow had successfully 'sunk' all seven.

At least twice in 2017, the USS Jimmy Carter, a U.S. Navy attack submarine which has been modified to support special forces operations, returned to its home port flying a Jolly Roger. The reason for flying the flag has not been made public.

== Symbols and meanings ==
Symbols common to multiple submarines
Symbol	Meaning
White bar	Merchant ship sunk
Red bar	Warship sunk
Bar with "U", or U with a horizontal line from each side	U-boat sunk
Yellow bar	Japanese merchant vessel sunk
Black and white bar	Merchant ship damaged but not sunk
Red and white bar	Warship damaged but not sunk
Dagger	'Cloak and dagger' operation: typically the delivery or recovery of shore parties from enemy territory
Stars (sometimes surrounding crossed cannon)	Deck gun was used to sink a target: white stars for merchant ships, red stars for warships
Sea mine	Minelaying operations; sometimes only one symbol used with a number indicating how many operations
Lighthouse	Used as navigational marker for an invasion force
Torch	Used as navigational marker for Operation Torch
Lifebuoy	Rescue personnel from downed aircraft or sunken ships
Tomahawk axe (individual or crossed)	Fired Tomahawk cruise missiles
Chevron, chamber pot, or Chinese junk	Small vessel sunk by gunfire
Eugene the Jeep	Recovery of Chariot manned torpedo
Diver's helmet	Exceeded safe diving depth
Cross pattée	Supply runs during Siege of Malta
Aircraft	Aircraft shot down
Red flower	Minefield reconnaissance
Crossed sabres	Boarded another vessel
Dog	Involved in Operation Husky
Grating	Forced an entry through a net barrier
Explosive with fuse	Ship sunk by demolition charge
Ram's head	Ramming

Symbols unique to a submarine
Symbol	Submarine	Meaning
Ace of spades	HMS Sickle	A torpedo missed its target and detonated against a cliff in Monte Carlo, with the shockwave breaking all the windows of a nearby casino.
Atom	HMS Conqueror	An Atom was included due to Conqueror being the first nuclear powered submarine to sink a ship when it sank ARA General Belgrano during the Falklands War.
Can opener	HMS Proteus	Survived attempted ramming by an Italian destroyer, with the ship heavily damaged by the submarine's hydroplanes
The Saint	HMS Unseen	'Cloak and dagger' operation, with halos indicating the number of operations: Unseen had permission from Leslie Charteris to use his character instead of the standard dagger
Stork and baby	HMS United	Captain's first child born while on patrol
Scarlet pimpernel flower	HMS Sibyl	A French spy, having forgotten the recognition password, quoted "They seek him here, they seek him there" from the play The Scarlet Pimpernel to identify herself
Train	HMS Turbulent	Fired on shore targets, destroying two trains and a goods depot

== See also ==
- Clean sweep (naval), another naval tradition indicating a successful patrol, where a broom is prominently fixed to the submarine
- Use of the skull and crossbones by military units
