= Waterford, Lexington =

Waterford-Pinnacle
- Neighborhood of Lexington, Kentucky
- Interactive map of Waterford-Pinnacle
- Coordinates: 37.966°N 84.510°W
- Country: United States
- State: Kentucky
- County: Fayette
- City: Lexington

Area
  - Total: .342 sq mi (0.89 km^{2})
  - Water: 0 sq mi (0.0 km^{2})

Population (2000)
  - Total: 1,481
  - Density: 4,327/sq mi (1,671/km^{2})
- Time zone: UTC-5 (Eastern (EST))
  - Summer (DST): UTC-4 (EDT)
- ZIP code: 40515
- Area code: 859

Waterford is a neighborhood in southeastern Lexington, Kentucky, United States. Its boundaries are Man o' War Boulevard to the north, Hickman Creek to the east, rural Fayette County to the west, and a combination of Poplar Springs Lane and Vermillion Peak Way to the south.

== Neighborhood statistics ==
- Area: 0.342 square miles (0.89 km^{2})
- Population: 1,481
- Population density: 4,327 people per square mile
- Median household income (2010): $84,619
