= South Point, Rolleston =

New Zealand shopping centre

South Point
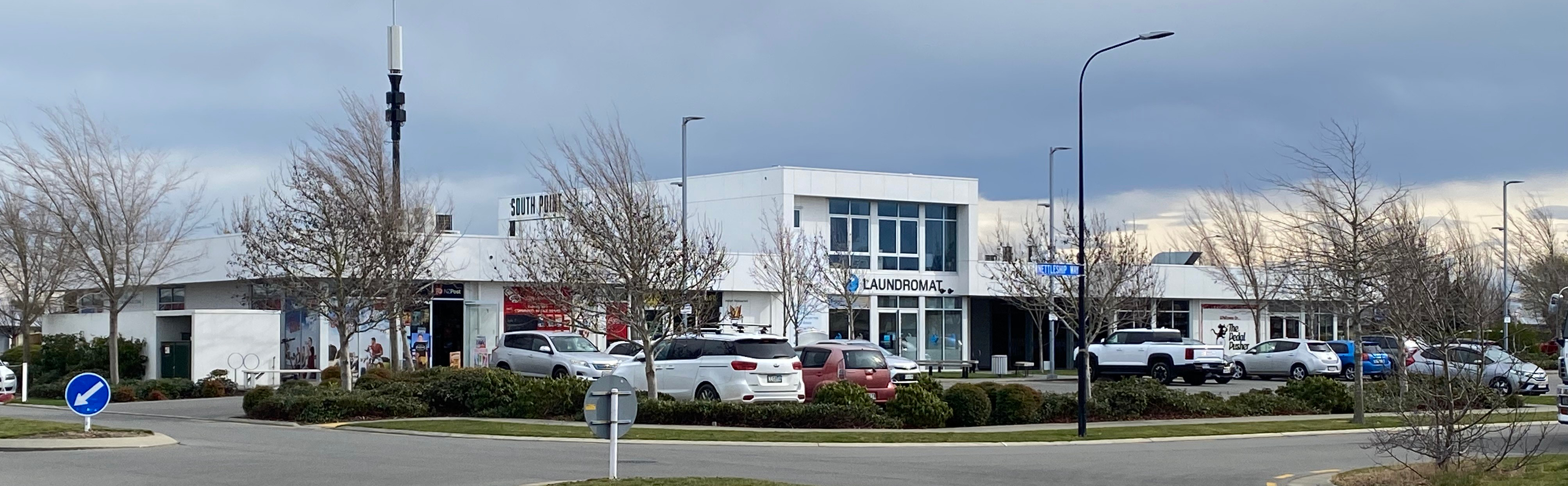
- South Point in 2025
- Location: Rolleston, New Zealand
- Coordinates: 43.6166°S 172.3888°E
- Address: 51-57 Faringdon Boulevard, Rolleston 7615
- Opened: 8 April 2017
- Developer: Foster Commercial Ltd
- Num. of stores: 9
- Floor area: 1000m^{2}
- Floors: 2

South Point is a shopping centre located in the Faringdon subdivision of Rolleston, New Zealand. It opened in 2017.

== History ==
South Point was developed in 2016 by Jo Southen and her sisters, Tania Croucher and Bridget Foster. The project was undertaken by their family company, Foster Commercial Ltd, and designed and built by Hanns Construction.

South Point opened on 8 April 2017.

In 2023, part of the shopping centre was damaged in a ram raid.

== Tenants ==
=== Current ===
South Point has three original tenants which continue to operate as of 2026:

- Faringdon Convenience Store – a dairy with NZ Post services
- The Pedal Pusher – a restaurant and bar with outdoor space
- A Pocket Full of Spices – an Indian restaurant

In addition, there are several other retail tenants operating as of 2026:

- Convergence Dance Studios – a dance studio operating on the second level
- Selwyn Dental – a surgical dental practice
- Beerience – a craft beer store
- Liquid – a laundromat
- Haven – a tanning and beauty clinic
- An office for Aurora Dairies

=== Former ===
The mall was formerly tenanted to Selwyn School of Dance, a clothing store, a barber, and a fish and chip shop.

== See also ==
- List of shopping centres in New Zealand
