= Gan (Addu Atoll) =

- Inhabited island
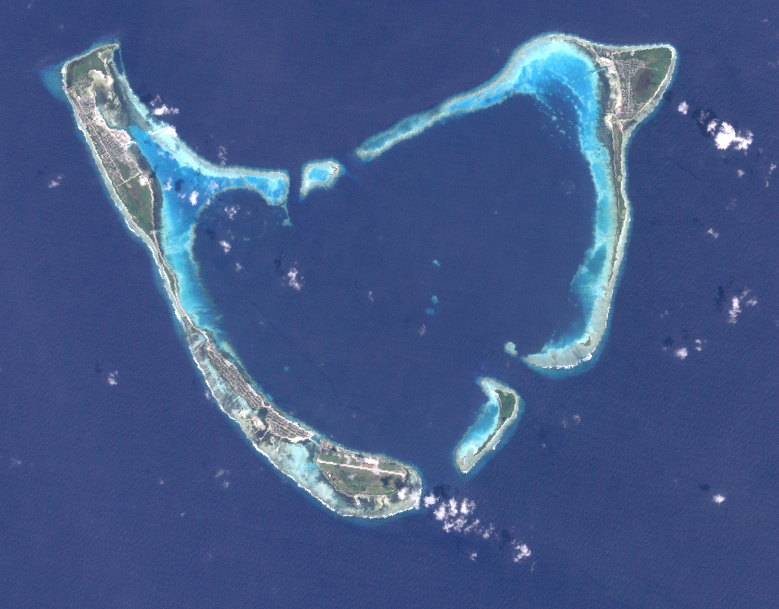
- Addu Atoll seen from space. Gan lies at the end of the continuous reef fringing Addu from the west and southwest

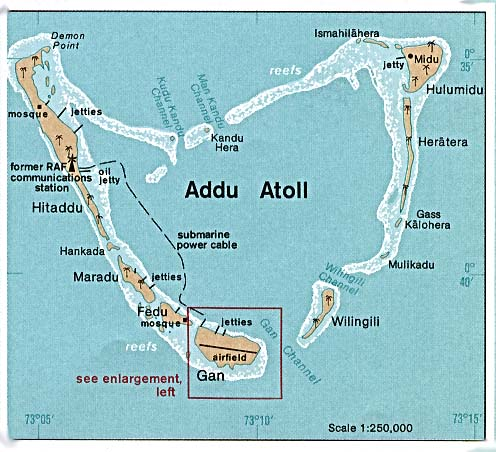
- 1976 map of Addu Atoll showing Gan and airfield

- Location in Maldives
- Coordinates: 00°41′40″S 073°09′18″E
- Country: Maldives
- Geographic atoll: Addu Atoll
- Distance to Malé: 258.48 km (160.61 mi)

Area
  - Total: 2.256 km^{2} (0.871 sq mi)

Dimensions
  - Length: 1.000 km (0.621 mi)
  - Width: 0.330 km (0.205 mi)

Population
  - Total: 1,104
  - Density: 489.4/km^{2} (1,267/sq mi)
- Time zone: UTC+05:00 (MST)

Gan (Dhivehi: ގަން) is the southernmost island of Addu Atoll (also known as Seenu Atoll), as well as the southernmost island of the Maldives. It is relatively large by Maldive standards.

The origin of the word "Gan" is in the Sanskrit word "Grama", meaning "village".

Gan is the second largest island of the atoll, after Hithadhoo, and measures 2.2561 square kilometres (0.87 sq mi) in area. Gan was formerly inhabited, but its inhabitants were moved to neighbouring islands after the British naval and airbase was built. It has had continuous human habitation since very ancient times and during the pre-Islamic era was the head island and a Buddhist place of learning in Addu. There were large cultivated fields of yams, manioc and coconut trees on this island. There were a few mosques in the village. A former havitta at island's east end had to be removed to build the runway.

Gan now has a hotel catering to tourists and is connected by causeways to the neighbouring islands of Feydu, Maradu and Hithadhoo.

== Archaeology ==
In 1922 H. C. P. Bell visited this island and investigated the ancient Buddhist ruins there. These included the foundations of a temple (vihara) and a mound or a low hill which was a very ruined stupa. Gan's ruins were the remains of the southernmost Buddhist site of the Maldives. The mound, as well as the foundations of the nearby vihara, were bulldozed when the airport was built.

== British base ==
In 1941, during the Second World War, the Royal Navy established a base ("Port T"). An isolated island base with a safe, deep anchorage in a suitably strategic position was required, and Addu met the requirements. Once available, its facilities were used extensively by the Fleet.

Royal Navy engineers landed in August 1941 from HMS Guardian to clear and construct airstrips on Gan for the Fleet Air Arm. In the interim, Catalina and Sunderland flying boats operated from jetties on the northern, sheltered side of Gan. Large oil tanks were built on Gan, and on Hitaddu Island on the western edge of the atoll; vital elements for a naval base. These were visible from a long distances at sea, but this was unavoidable, given the atoll's low profile.

Ship's supplies for the fleet were provided from a pair of Australian refrigerated ships, Changte and Taiping that included Addu in a number of bases that they serviced regularly. Three times these ships replenished forty or more ships of the Eastern Fleet. Several large Australian Imperial Force troop convoys also refueled at Addu on their way from Aden to Fremantle, Western Australia.

The six major islands were garrisoned by the 1st Royal Marine Coast Defence Regiment, manning shore batteries and anti-aircraft guns. To facilitate the defence, causeways were built connecting the western islands of Gan, Eyehook (Abuhera), Maradhoo and Hithadhoo and, much later in the war, they were linked by a light railway. Addu was an unpopular posting due to the hot, humid climate, lack of recreational facilities and lack of socialising with the local population.

The Japanese remained unaware of the base's existence until their plans for expansion in South-east Asia had come to nothing, even during their carrier raids in the Indian Ocean in April 1942. Later in the war, submarine reconnaissance established the base's existence. Despite openings into the lagoon being permanently closed by anti-submarine nets, the German U-boat U-183 torpedoed the tanker British Loyalty in March 1944 (she had been previously torpedoed and sunk at Diego Suarez in May 1942, but was raised and towed to Addu for use as an oil storage vessel); this was a long-range shot from outside the atoll through a gap in the anti-torpedo nets. Although seriously damaged, the tanker did not sink. She was not fully repaired but kept as a Ministry of War Transport Oil Fuel Storage Vessel. There was significant oil pollution after this incident and British personnel were used to clean the lagoon, but they were only partially successful.

On 5 January 1946, British Loyalty was scuttled southeast of Hithadhoo Island in the Addu Atoll lagoon. Despite the fact that she is still leaking oil, she has become a popular diving location.

In 1957, the naval base was transferred to the Royal Air Force. From 1957, during the Cold War, it was used as an outpost as RAF Gan. The base remained in intermittent service until 1976, when British Forces withdrew.

From Gan Island several rockets of the Kookaburra type were launched from a pad at 0°41' S and 73°9' E.

Most of the employees who had experience working for the British military spoke fluent English. When the base at Gan was closed for good, they turned to the nascent tourism industry for employment. As a result, there was an influx of Addu people to Malé seeking employment in the nearby resorts and also looking for education for their children.

After the British military left, the airstrip was neglected and remained almost unused for many decades. Recently it has been developed into what is now Gan International Airport and also has a tourist resort, Equator Village.

== Climate ==
Gan has a tropical rainforest climate (Köppen: Af) with heavy rainfall year-round.

Climate data for Gan, (elevation 1.8 m (5.9 ft), 1991−2020 normals)
Month	Jan	Feb	Mar	Apr	May	Jun	Jul	Aug	Sep	Oct	Nov	Dec	Year
Mean daily maximum °C (°F)	30.7 (87.3)	31.2 (88.2)	31.6 (88.9)	31.6 (88.9)	31.3 (88.3)	31.2 (88.2)	30.8 (87.4)	30.7 (87.3)	30.6 (87.1)	30.6 (87.1)	30.5 (86.9)	30.5 (86.9)	30.9 (87.6)
Daily mean °C (°F)	28.1 (82.6)	28.6 (83.5)	28.7 (83.7)	28.8 (83.8)	28.6 (83.5)	28.4 (83.1)	28.0 (82.4)	27.9 (82.2)	27.8 (82.0)	27.9 (82.2)	27.8 (82.0)	27.8 (82.0)	28.2 (82.8)
Mean daily minimum °C (°F)	25.2 (77.4)	25.6 (78.1)	25.5 (77.9)	25.5 (77.9)	25.4 (77.7)	25.3 (77.5)	24.9 (76.8)	24.7 (76.5)	24.8 (76.6)	24.8 (76.6)	24.7 (76.5)	24.8 (76.6)	25.1 (77.2)
Average precipitation mm (inches)	203.7 (8.02)	79.2 (3.12)	120.5 (4.74)	172.5 (6.79)	242.9 (9.56)	143.7 (5.66)	197.6 (7.78)	195.5 (7.70)	223.6 (8.80)	243.8 (9.60)	234.8 (9.24)	225.5 (8.88)	2,283.3 (89.89)
Average precipitation days (≥ 0.1 mm)	10.6	5.8	7.1	11.7	13.4	9.3	11.6	11.8	12.8	14.6	15.2	14.4	138.3
Mean monthly sunshine hours	241.4	247.9	267.1	245.3	231.3	217.4	204.6	211.2	196.6	219.1	224.2	229.2	2,735.3
Source: NOAA

== See also ==
- Gan (Huvadhu Atoll)
- Gan (Laamu Atoll)
