= HMAS Bungaree =

Cargo ship and WW2 minelayer

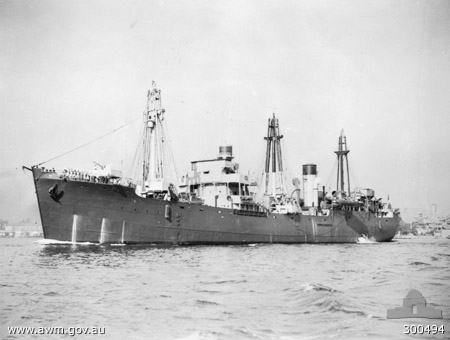
- HMAS Bungaree in Sydney Harbour

History
- Name: 1937: Bungaree; 1957: Dampier; 1960: Eastern Mariner; 1966: Kitagawa Maru No. 15
- Namesake: 1937: Bungaree, South Australia; 1957: Dampier, Western Australia
- Owner: 1937: Adelaide SS Co; 1957: Kowloon Navigation Co Ltd; 1960: Pan Norse SS Co, SA; 1963: Mariner Ocean Transport, SA
- Operator: 1940: (United Kingdom) Royal Australian Navy; 1957: HC Sleigh Ltd, Melbourne; 1960: Wallem & Co; 1966: Japanese salvors
- Port of registry: 1937: (Australia) Melbourne; 1957: (United Kingdom) Hong Kong; 1960: Panama
- Ordered: April 1936
- Builder: Caledon S&E, Dundee
- Yard number: 362
- Launched: 9 February 1937
- Sponsored by: Mrs MG Anderson
- Completed: May 1937
- Acquired: requisitioned October 1940
- Commissioned: into RAN: 9 June 1941
- Decommissioned: from RAN: 7 August 1946
- Refit: 1940–41
- Identification: 1937: UK official number 159564; 1937: call sign VLJX; 1957: call sign ZEKG; 1960: call sign HPDD
- Honours and awards: Battle honour: Pacific 1942–43
- Fate: Scrapped in 1968

General characteristics
- Type: 1937: cargo ship; 1941: minelayer; 1944: survey ship; stores ship; 1947: cargo ship
- Tonnage: 3,043 GRT; 1,592 NRT; 5,190 DWT
- Length: 357.2 ft (108.9 m) registered; 370 ft 0 in (112.78 m) overall
- Beam: 48.7 ft (14.8 m)
- Draught: 22 ft 3 1/4 in (6.79 m)
- Depth: 20.5 ft (6.2 m)
- Decks: 1
- Installed power: triple-expansion engine + exhaust turbine; 390 NHP; 1,750 ihp
- Propulsion: 1 × screw
- Speed: 11 1/2 knots (21 km/h)
- Capacity: 1941: 423 mines; later: 467 mines
- Complement: as minelayer: 175
- Crew: as cargo ship: 41
- Armament: in WW2: 2 × 4-inch guns; 1 × 12-pounder gun; 4 × Oerlikon 20 mm cannon; 2 × machine guns
- Notes: sister ship: Beltana

HMAS Bungaree was a cargo steamship. She was built in Scotland in 1937 as Bungaree for the Adelaide Steamship Company of South Australia. The Royal Australian Navy requisitioned her in 1940, and had her converted into a minelayer. She was Australia's only minelayer in the Second World War, and laid more than 10,000 mines. In 1944 she changed rôles, becoming first a survey ship, and then a stores ship. The Navy returned her to her owners in 1947.

In 1957 the Adelaide SS Co sold Bungaree. Her new owners renamed her Dampier, and registered her in Hong Kong. In 1960 she was sold again; renamed Eastern Mariner; and transferred to the Panamanian flag of convenience. In South Vietnam in 1966 a mine damaged her, and then mortar damage sank her. Japanese salvors raised her, and renamed her Kitagawa Maru No. 15. She was scrapped in Hong Kong in 1968.

== Building ==
Bungaree was the first of a series of cargo steamships that the Caledon Shipbuilding & Engineering Company in Dundee on the Firth of Tay built between 1937 and 1939 for Australian shipping companies to use in the coastal trade between the different states and territories of Australia. The Adelaide SS Co ordered the first two ships in April 1936. Caledon built them as yard numbers 362 and 363, and launched them in 1937 as Bungaree and Beltana. Yard number 371 was launched in 1938 as Kooringa, a slightly enlarged version for McIlwraith, McEacharn & Co. Slightly larger again was yard number 370, which was launched in 1938 as Barossa for the Adelaide SS Co. In 1939 Caledon launched two more ships to the same dimensions as Barossa: yard number 374 as Bundaleer for the Adelaide SS Co, and yard number 380 as Barwon for Huddart Parker.

Mrs MG Anderson, wife of the Chairman of the Directors of the Adelaide SS Co, launched Bungaree in Dundee on 9 February 1937. The ship was named after Bungaree, South Australia. She was completed that May.

== Description and registration ==
Bungaree's lengths were 370 ft 0 in (112.78 m) overall and 357.2 ft (108.9 m) registered. Her beam was 48.7 ft (14.8 m); her depth was 20.5 ft (6.2 m); and her draught was 22 ft 3 1/4 in (6.79 m). Her tonnages were 3,043 GRT; 1,592 NRT; and about 5,190 DWT. She was a tweendecker, with five holds. She had lockers for bond and special cargo, and a strongroom for specie and other high-value cargo. She had three masts, and her derricks, when not in use, were stowed upright against them. She had 15 derricks, worked by 14 team winches made by Clarke, Chapman & Co of Gateshead, England, who also made her windlass. One of her derricks could lift up to 25 tons; four could lift ten tons, and the other ten could lift five tons. Her boiler room; engine room; and single funnel were aft, between holds 4 and 5. Amidships she had superstructures with berths for her deck officers and engineer officers. Berths for her crew were in her poop, aft of hold 4. She had a raked bow and cruiser stern.

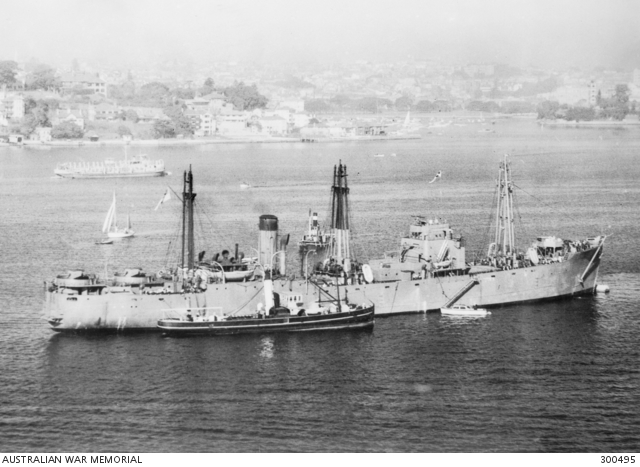
Aerial view of HMAS Bungaree, showing the arrangement of her masts and superstructures

Bungaree had a single screw. John G Kincaid & Co of Greenock built her main engine, which was a three-cylinder triple-expansion engine. She also had a Bauer-Wach exhaust turbine, made by Swan, Hunter & Wigham Richardson, which drove the same propeller shaft via a Föttinger fluid coupling and double reduction gearing. The combined power of her reciprocating engine plus turbine was rated at 390 NHP, or 1,750 ihp at 75.5 rpm, which gave her a speed of about 11 1/2 knots (21 km/h). The exhaust turbine was for fuel efficiency and economy. At the time, it was argued that for engines between 1,500 and 8,000 shp, a reciprocating engine plus exhaust turbine could be more economic than a diesel engine. Bungaree and her sister ships were coal-burners. Sir Howard Lloyd, one of the directors of the Adelaide SS Co, said that the company wanted to avoid being entirely dependent on oil for bunkering.

Bungaree was registered in Melbourne. Her UK official number was 159564, and her wireless telegraph call sign was VLJX.

== Pre-war career ==
On 9 May 1937 Bungaree left Dundee for Australia, with Captain VL Adie as her Master. She sailed via the Cape of Good Hope, and as she crossed the Indian Ocean she made wireless contact with Australia at a range of 2,500 miles (4,000 km). She reached Sydney, New South Wales on 5 July.

On 1 February 1939, Bungaree arrived in Cairns, Queensland, to discharge a cargo of coal. At about 23:30 hrs that evening, police were called to the ship. A police sergeant arrived at about 23:45 hrs, and found the body of a 45-year-old seaman lying on the deck of the crew's mess aft. An ambulance and doctor were called. The doctor pronounced the seaman to be dead. He found bruises on the man's face, hip, and loin, and identified the causes of death as a basilar skull fracture, and a brain hæmorrhage. The doctor considered that either a fall, or a punch on the jaw, could have caused the fatal fracture.

Witnesses told police of an altercation between the deceased and another crew member. The deceased had joined the crew at Newcastle, New South Wales, on 21 January. On the evening of his death, he had a few drinks, but was coherent. He entered the quarters of a 50-year-old shipmate aboard Bungaree, and called him a "[redacted] scabby [redacted]". The 50-year-old first told the deceased to go away, and then pushed him out of his cabin and into the crew mess-room, where he restrained the deceased by his wrists. When the 50-year-old let go, the deceased punched the other man in the chest, The other man retaliated with three or four punches to the deceased's jaw. The latter fell to the deck, and never regained consciousness. Police arrested the 50-year-old, and on 3 February Cairns Police Court committed him to be tried for unlawful killing.

At about 16:30 hrs on 9 February, Bungaree docked in Darling Harbour, Sydney. About an hour later, about 40 seamen gathered at the wharf to protest that a number of her crew, who they said were not members of the Seamen's Union of Australia, should leave the ship. Officials denied them permission to enter the wharf, but about 20 of them forced their way in. Then protested alongside the ship for several minutes, and then withdrew outside the gates. "Special transport arrangements" were made for the non-union crew to leave the ship.

In Cairns the next day, 11 February, the northern Crown Prosecutor, JPA Quinn, entered "no true bill" against the seaman who had punched the deceased.

== Wartime career ==
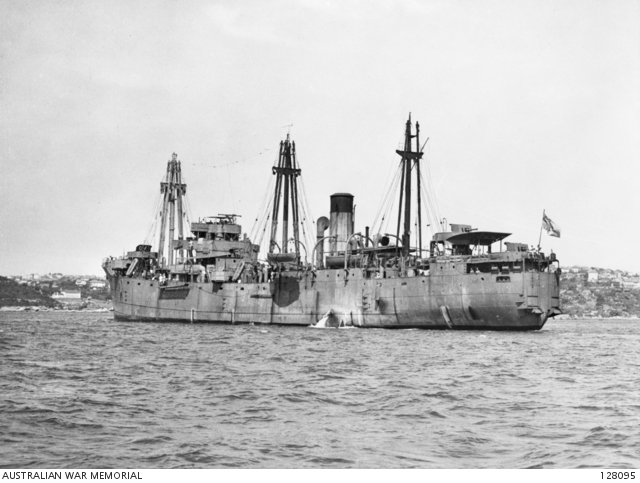
Port quarter view of HMAS Bungaree, showing her cruiser stern

The Royal Australian Navy requisitioned Bungaree in October 1940. She was converted into a minelayer, and defensively armed with two 4-inch guns; one 12-pounder gun; four Oerlikon 20 mm cannon; and two machine guns. At first she had capacity for 423 mines, but later this was increased to 467. She was Commissioned as HMAS Bungaree on 9 June 1941.

Bungaree laid her first minefield in August 1941, off Port Moresby in Papua. As Australia's only minelayer, she laid more than 10,000 mines in the waters of Australia and New Zealand. She was in Sydney Harbour during the Japanese midget submarine attack on 31 May 1942. As the Allies moved onto the offensive the need for defensive minefields lessened, Bungaree became a survey ship from January 1944, and a stores ship from August 1944. She was awarded the battle honour "Pacific 1942–43" for her wartime service.

== Atlas crew rescue ==
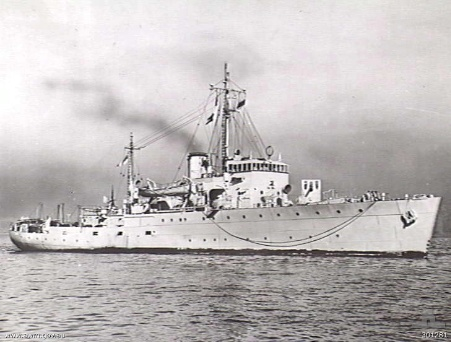
The corvette HMAS Rockhampton

On the night of 2 November 1945, the 4,810 GRT collier Atlas, en route in ballast from Hong Kong to Cairns, grounded on Bougainville Reef in the Coral Sea Islands. Her double bottom ruptured, spilling fuel oil into the sea, and water from her freshwater tanks into the interior of the ship. Bungaree received her wireless distress signal; reached Atlas early on 3 November; and rescued most of her company: 28 lascars; four naval gunners; one naval signaller; and two of her engineering officers. The Master; eight officers; the Chief Steward; and two lascars remained aboard Atlas, but her condition deteriorated in a heavy sea, so the corvette HMAS Rockhampton and Royal Navy destroyer HMS Wessex rescued them.

== Engine failure ==
In December 1945, the Burns, Philp & Co steamship Morinda grounded on a reef in the New Hebrides. She was refloated, but was unable to make a scheduled voyage taking supplies to Lord Howe Island; Norfolk Island; and Port Vila in the New Hebrides. Bungaree was sent in her stead, and left Sydney on Christmas Eve, 24 December. She was carrying mail; about 1,000 tons of food; and 150 drums of petrol as deck cargo. She was also carrying about 20 islanders from Lord Howe Island and Norfolk Island, who were returning home after being demobilised from the Second Australian Imperial Force and the Royal Australian Air Force.

However, she developed engine trouble, and off Chowder Bay she signalled that she was turning back. She left Sydney again at 02:00 hrs on Christmas Day, 25 December, but that afternoon, 50 to 70 nautical miles (93 to 130 km) east of Sydney, she developed engine trouble a second time, and sent a distress signal. The corvette HMAS Gladstone embarked specialist engineers; left port at 01:00 hrs on 26 December; and reached Bungaree about 07:00 hrs.

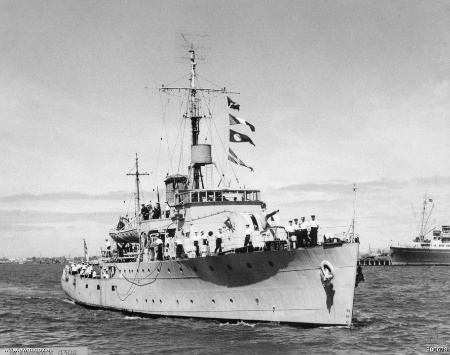
The corvette HMAS Gladstone

Gladstone then accompanied Bungaree back to Sydney, but accounts differ as to the details. The Sydney Morning Herald said that Gladstone towed Bungaree back to port. The Age said that the corvette towed her until the engineers had made enough repairs for Bungaree to make her own way, with her engines running at low speed Both The Daily Telegraph and The Daily Mirror said that by the time Gladstone reached her, Bungaree's engineers had already repaired her engines enough for her to make steerage way. A second corvette, HMAS Ipswich, followed Gladstone out of Sydney to join in the rescue. She cleared Sydney Heads at 10:00 hrs; nine hours after Gladstone. Bungaree steamed slowly through the Heads at 10:00 hrs on 27 December, accompanied by the two corvettes, and went straight to Garden Island for repairs.

The Navy decommissioned Bungaree on 7 August 1946, and returned her to her owners on 5 November 1947. Between 1945 and 1948 the Navy swept the mines she laid in Australian waters.

== Dampier ==
In 1957 the Kowloon Navigation Company bought Bungaree from the Adelaide SS Co. Her 41 Australian crew took her from Sydney as far as Thursday Island in the Torres Strait, where they were to be discharged, and an Australian National Airways charter flight was to fly them back to Australia. A Hong Kong crew was due to reach Thursday island aboard the China Navigation Company motor ship Taiyuan on 13 June to take over Bungaree. Her new owners renamed the ship Dampier, after Dampier, Western Australia, and registered her in Hong Kong. Her call sign was ZEKG.

== Eastern Mariner ==
In 1960 the Pan Norse Steamship Company, SA, acquired Dampier; renamed her Eastern Mariner; and Wallem & Co became her managers. She was registered in Panama, and her call sign was HPDD. In 1963 Mariner Ocean Transport SA became her owners, but Wallem & Co remained her managers.

On 26 May 1966, Eastern Mariner struck a mine in the Saigon River about 8 miles (13 km) southeast of Saigon. She remained afloat, and was towed to Nhà Bè, but was then sunk by mortar damage. Japanese salvors refloated her; took possession of her; and renamed her Kitagawa Maru No. 15. In July 1968 she arrived in Hong Kong, where Kwan Ho scrapped her.

== Bibliography ==
- Gill, G. Herman (1957). Royal Australian Navy, 1939–1942. Official History of Australia in the War of 1939–1945. Series 2 – Navy. Vol. I (1st ed.). Canberra: Australian War Memorial.
- Gillett, Ross; Graham, Colin (1977). Warships of Australia. Adelaide: Rigby. ISBN 0-7270-0472-7.
- Jenkins, David (1992). Battle Surface! Japan's Submarine War Against Australia 1942–44. Milsons Point, NSW: Random House Australia. ISBN 0-09-182638-1.
- Lange, Don (26 November 2001). "Mystery Ship Bungaree" (PDF). Navy News. Vol. 44, no. 23. Sydney: Royal Australian Navy. Archived from the original (PDF) on 29 October 2017.
- Lloyd's Register of Shipping (PDF). Vol. II.–Steamers and Motorships of 300 Tons. London: Lloyd's Register of Shipping. 1938 – via Southampton City Council.
- Mercantile Navy List. London: Registrar General of Shipping and Seamen. 1938 – via Crew List Index Project.
- Morley, Dave (12 September 2013). "Corvette's final sweep". Navy News. Sydney, NSW: Royal Australian Navy.
- Register Book. Vol. Register of Ships. London: Lloyd's Register of Shipping. 1958 – via Internet Archive.
- Register Book. Vol. Register of Ships. London: Lloyd's Register of Shipping. 1959 – via Internet Archive.
- Straczek, Joe (2000). "Bungaree – One and Only". Australian Warship Review. 2000 (6).
