= Hong Kong and Whampoa Dock =

Hong Kong dockyard

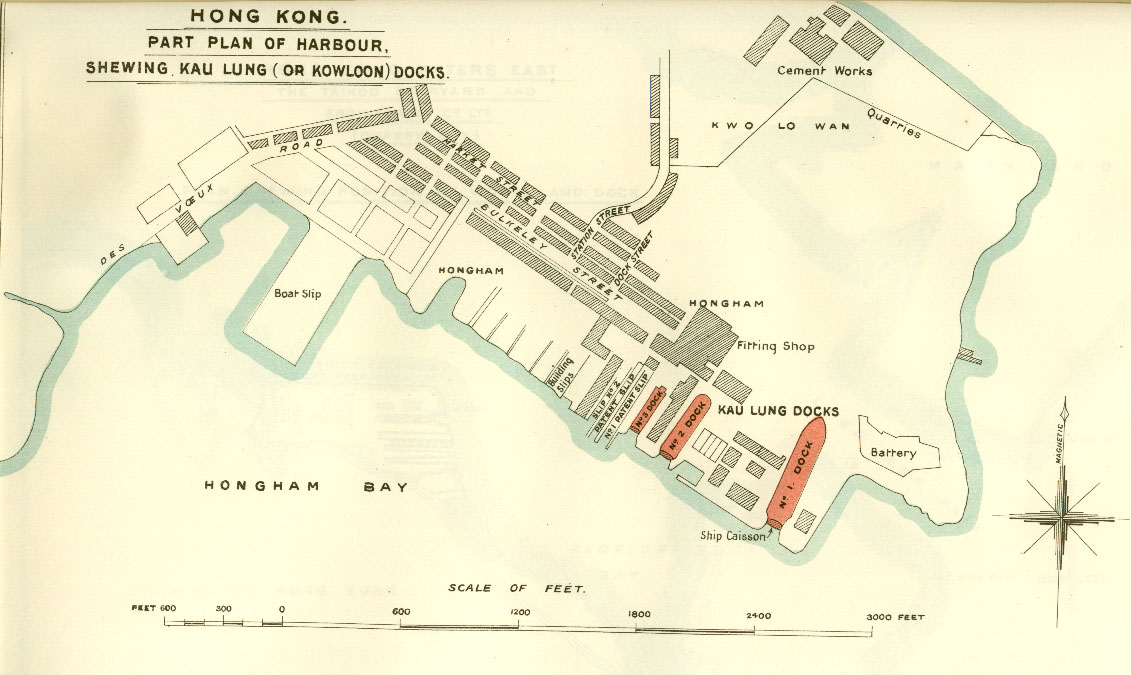
Plan of the Kowloon Dockyard in the 1900s

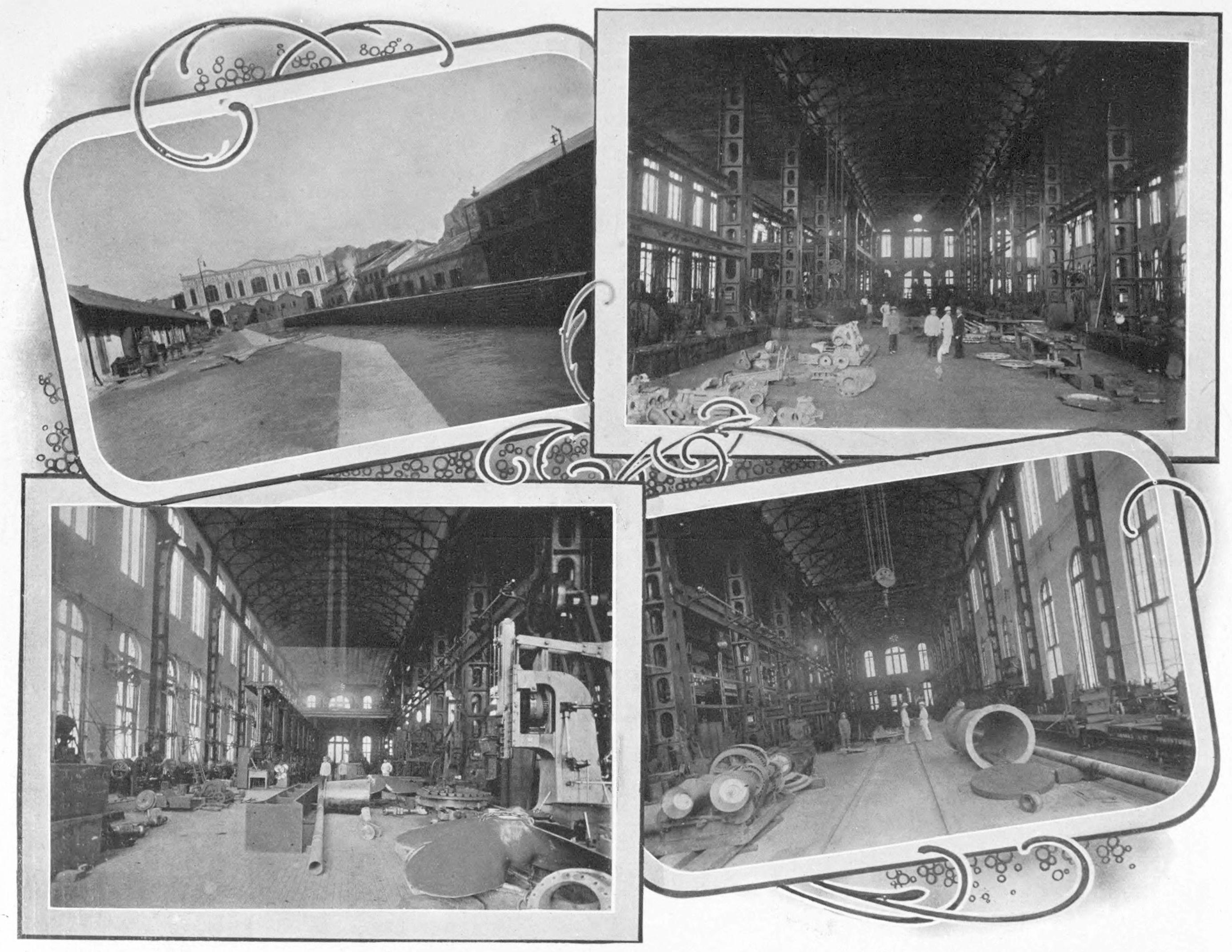
Hong Kong and Whampoa Dock c. 1908

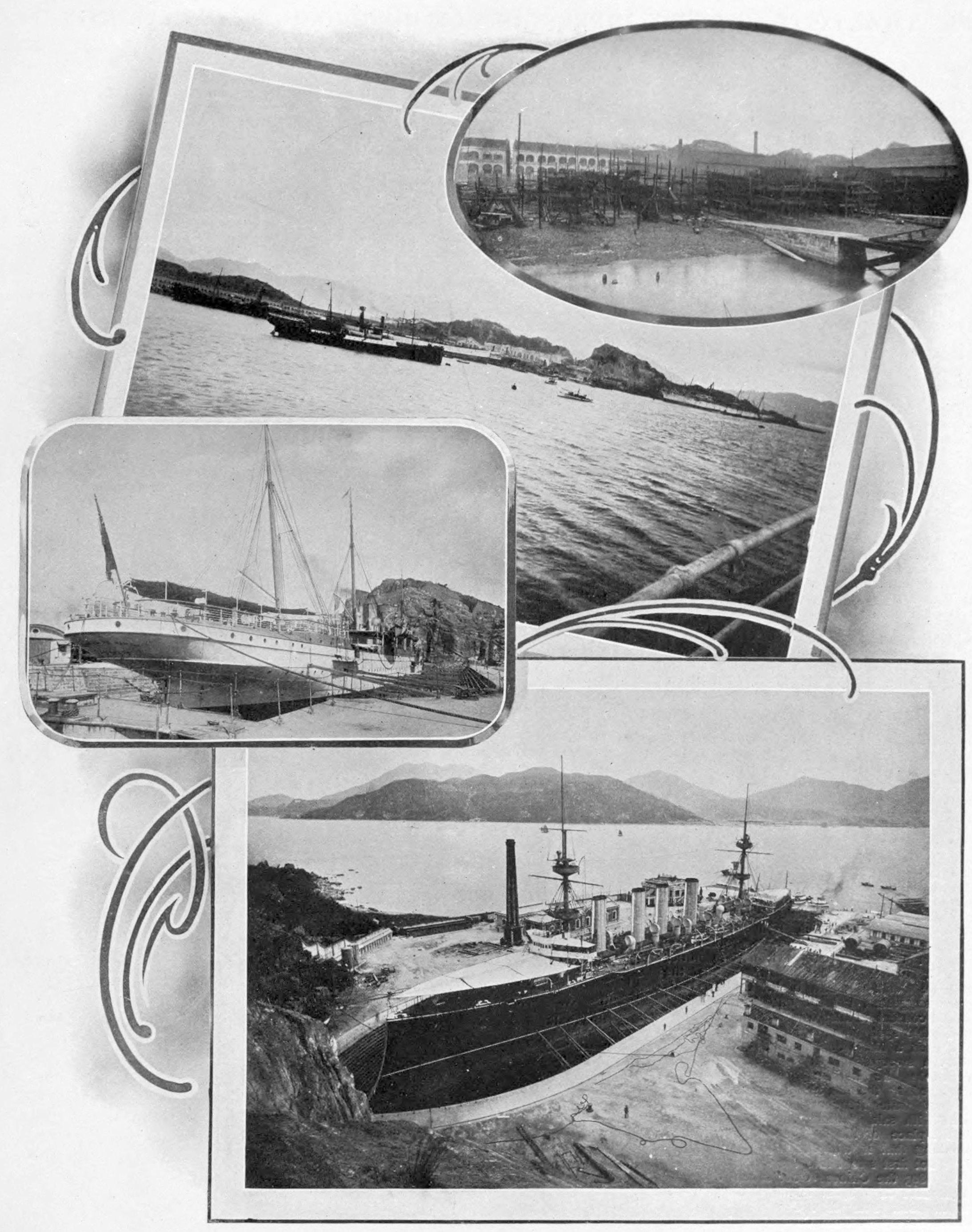
Hong Kong and Whampoa Dock c. 1908

Hong Kong and Whampoa Dock was a Hong Kong dockyard, once among the largest in Asia.

== History ==
The Hong Kong and Whampoa Dock Company was founded in 1866 by Douglas Lapraik and Thomas Sutherland. It was located on the west Kowloon coast between Hung Hom and Tai Wan, facing Hung Hom Bay in the Victoria Harbour.

The company was known variously as Hong Kong Kowloon and Whampoa Dock Company, Kowloon Docks, and Whampoa Dock. "Whampoa" is derived from the romanized name of the harbor located at Huangpu Island, adjacent to the city of Guangzhou, which was previously romanized as Canton, where the company owned another dockyard.

On the eve of Japanese occupation of Hong Kong, the dockyard was heavily bombarded by Japanese aircraft due to its importance, causing many casualties.

In the mid-1960s, the Hong Kong and Whampoa Dock Company was controlled by Douglas Clague through Hutchison International but he was forced to leave following financial difficulties with Hutchison International. Hutchison International was acquired by Li Ka Shing's Cheung Kong Holdings and eventually merged with Whampoa to become Hutchison Whampoa. In 1985, the dockyard land was transformed into a private housing estate, the Whampoa Garden, the second-largest private housing estate in Hong Kong, after Mei Foo Sun Chuen. The only portion of the dockyard that exists is Bulkeley Street. The dockyard is now part of the Whampoa Garden site residential complex.

The dockyard operations merged with Swire's Taikoo Dockyard on the Island to become Hongkong United Dockyards on the new territories western shore of Tsing Yi Island Wok Tai Wan.

Hong Kong and Whampoa Dock helped converted Hong Kong Tramways second and third generation tram cars built by United Electric and English Electric. These cars were eventually retired from 1924 to 1930 as the fourth-generation cars were introduced.

Other facilities:

- Hope Dry Dock in Aberdeen, opened 1867.

== Ships ==
House flag now hoisted at Whampoa Plaza of Hong Kong

Ships built at this yard include:

- Leyte (1887) gunboat with Spanish and later USN gunboat.
- Manok (1930) Built for La Naviera Filipina, Inc., Cebu, Philippine Islands. Capsized and sank between Silinog and Aliguay Islands off Dapitan, and Apo Island off Dumaguete on Aug 5, 1941.
- Foo-mun-tsai (1881); Built for the Qing government's Canton Customs Authority.
- USS Mariveles (1886)
- Con-rong (1887); French steamer.
- Mellong (1901); Steamer built for German company Norddeutscher Lloyd for river use around Bangkok.
- Fathomer (1904)
- USS San Felipe (YFB-12) (1907)
- USS Banaag (YT-104) (1910)
- Kwai Sang (1917)
- S.S. Suddhadib 1918 (Maiden voyage; Hong Kong 22 April 1918), Built for the Siam Steam Navigation Company (part of the East Asiatic Company (EAC) - Bangkok-based, Danish owner) Shipwrecked: 01-06-1945 Allied Bombing - Siam Bay.
- S.S. Valaya, 1918 sister ship to S.S. Suddhadib. (Maiden voyage; Hong Kong June 15th) Built for the Siam Steam Navigation Company (part of the East Asiatic Company (EAC) - Bangkok-based, Danish owner) Shipwrecked: 13 Jan 1944 (sunk by mines in the mouth of Chao Phraya River in 1944)
- War Bomber (1919); 5,226 ton (8,000 ton deadweight), 400 foot warship, largest ship to date built at the Kowloon Docks for Shipping Controller, London. Later, would come into Japanese service during WWII and be sunk on 4 September 1942 as Kaimei Maru.
- War Trooper (1919); 8,000 ton (deadweight), 400 foot warship, sister ship of the War Bomber.Later entered Greek service as Ambatielos, returning to British service in 1923 as King Gruffydd. In 1939, pressed into Admiralty service as HMS Maunder (X-28), torpedoed and sunk in 1943.
- SS Changte (1925) for Australian Oriental Line; later became Royal Navy Naval Stores Issuing Ship RFA Y1-9.
- SS Taiping (1925) for Australian Oriental Line
- Sang Wo (1926)
- USS YAG-3 (1926)
- SS Prince Narisra (1929). Yard no. 336. Siam Steamship Navigation Company, Bangkok. Damaged during bombing 1945 in Bangkok. Scrapped 1949 BKK
- USS YAG-4 (1931)
- Li Wo (1938); 1,000 ton passenger ship later converted as a patrol vessel for the Royal Navy; sank near Singapore in 1942 as HMS Li Wo.
- HMAS Matafele (1938)
- Ranger (1940), ocean-going tugboat
- SS Empire Moonbeam
- SS Empire Almond (1941)
- SS Gyōkū Maru (1942)
- and many of the Hong Kong Star Ferry vessels in service today.

== See also ==
- Cosmopolitan Dock
