= Cronulla (disambiguation) =

Cronulla may refer to:

- Cronulla, a southern suburb of Sydney, New South Wales
- Cronulla-Sutherland Sharks, a rugby league team previously known as the Cronulla Sharks
- Electoral district of Cronulla, a seat in the New South Wales Legislative Assembly
- Cronulla railway station
- Cronulla railway line
- Cronulla Beach
- Cronulla Surf Life Saving Club
- 2005 Cronulla riots
- Cronulla sand dunes
- Cronulla, a steamship originally named Barossa
