= USS San Felipe =

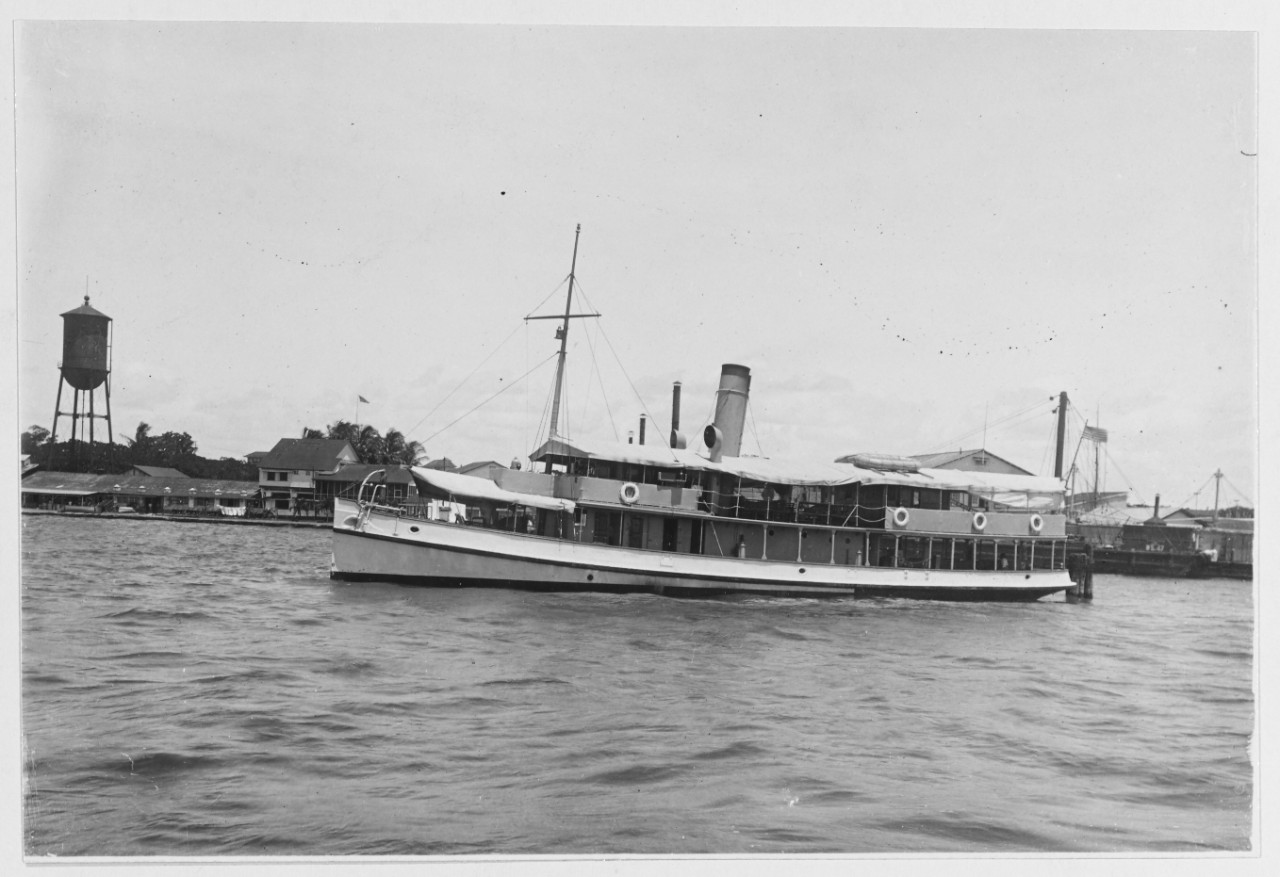
- YFB-12 photographed off the Cavite Navy Yard, Philippines, during the 1920s or 1930s

History

United States
- Name: Engineer
- Operator: United States Army
- Builder: Hong Kong & Whampoa Dock Company, Hong Kong
- Launched: 1907
- Completed: 1907
- Fate: transferred to the U.S. Navy, 28 December 1917; transferred back to the U.S. Army, 1919; transferred back to the U.S. Navy, 9 October 1922

United States
- Operator: United States Navy
- Renamed: San Felipe
- Reclassified: ferry boat (YFB-12)
- Stricken: 24 July 1942
- Honours and awards: 1 Battle Stars; American Defense Service Medal; Asiatic-Pacific Campaign Medal; World War II Victory Medal; Philippine Defense Medal
- Fate: captured by Japanese forces, 6 May 1942

Japan
- Operator: Imperial Japanese Army
- Renamed: Aki Maru
- Reclassified: transport ship
- Identification: IJA 2215
- Fate: unknown

General characteristics
- Class & type: tugboat
- Tonnage: 298.8 gross register tons
- Length: 111.5 ft (34.0 m) o/a
- Beam: 21.67 ft (6.61 m)
- Draught: 9.75 ft (2.97 m)
- Installed power: 500 Steam horsepower
- Propulsion: two vertical triple expansion (9"-14"-25"x15") steam engines, twin screws
- Speed: 10 knots

San Felipe (YFB-12) (ex-Engineer) was a United States Army steel tugboat that later served as a ferryboat in the U.S. Navy and as an Imperial Japanese Army transport during World War II.

== History ==
She was completed in 1907 at the Hong Kong shipyard of Hong Kong & Whampoa Dock Company for the benefit of the United States Army as the steel tugboat, Engineer. On 28 December 1917, she was transferred to the United States Navy and assigned to the United States Asiatic Fleet, 16th Naval District but then returned to the U.S. Army in 1919. On 9 October 1922, she was transferred back to the U.S. Navy, 16th Naval District to replace the Callao (YFB-11). On 1 November 1922, she was renamed San Felipe and designated as ferryboat/launch, YFB-12. She worked as a ferry boat between the Cavite and Manila. On 10 December 1941, she was assigned to the Inshore Patrol and survived the bombing of Cavite Naval Yard and on 8 April 1942, she assisted in the evacuation of personnel from the Mariveles Naval Section Base to Corregidor during the Battle of Bataan. On 6 May 1942, she was captured by Japanese forces after the Fall of Corregidor and returned to service as Imperial Japanese Army transport Aki Maru. Her ultimate fate is unknown.

On 24 July 1942, she was struck from the Naval Register. She earned one battle star.
