= USS YAG-4 =

History

United States Navy
- Name: YAG-4
- Builder: Hong Kong and Whampoa Dock Company Ltd., Hong Kong
- Launched: 1931
- Sponsored by: North Negros Sugar Company Ltd.
- Acquired: acquired by the U.S. Navy, 25 June 1941
- Stricken: 22 February 1943
- Honours and awards: 1 Battle Stars; American Defense Service Medal; Asiatic-Pacific Campaign Medal; World War II Victory Medal; Philippine Defense Medal
- Fate: Sunk by gunfire, 12 April 1942

General characteristics
- Tonnage: 248 gross register tons
- Length: 125.7 ft (38.3 m) o/a
- Beam: 24.1 ft (7.3 m)
- Draught: 7.5 ft (2.3 m)
- Installed power: 200 bhp
- Propulsion: one Atlas 4-cylinder diesel

The USS YAG-4 was a miscellaneous auxiliary service craft of the United States Navy that served during World War II.

== History ==
She was built by the Hong Kong and Whampoa Dock Company Ltd. in Hong Kong for the benefit of the North Negros Sugar Company Ltd. in Manapla, Iloilo, Philippines. She was steel-hulled. She was launched in 1931 as the MV Manapla. On 25 June 1941, the United States Navy purchased her from the North Negros Sugar Company and designated her as a Miscellaneous Auxiliary Service Craft (YAG). She was assigned to the Cavite Navy Yard, 16th Naval District. On 25 October 1941, she began a conversion to a minesweeper which was expected to be completed by 15 December 1941. Her conversion was interrupted by the bombing of the Cavite Navy Yard and the fall of Manila. She was assigned to the Inshore Patrol during the Battle of Bataan and on 8 April 1942, she assisted in the evacuation of soldiers from Mariveles Naval Section Base, Bataan. On 12 April 1942, she was sunk by Japanese gunfire in the South Harbor of Corregidor. She was struck from the Naval List on 22 February 1943.

She was awarded one battle star.
