= USS Leyte =

USS Leyte may refer to the following ships of the United States Navy:

- USS Leyte (1887), was a 151-ton Spanish gunboat built in 1887 in Hong Kong by Hong Kong and Whampoa Dock and captured during the Spanish–American War. The vessel served on the Asiatic Station in the Philippines as ferry boat/guard ship from 1900 until 1902, then as a target range and ferry to 1907. Sold and fate unknown after 1907.
- USS Leyte (ARG-8), was a repair ship commissioned August 1944 and renamed Maui in May 1945
- USS Leyte (CV-32), was an aircraft carrier commissioned in 1946 and decommissioned in 1959

== See also ==
- USS Leyte Gulf (CG-55), a guided missile cruiser launched in 1986 and decommissioned in 2024
