= USS YAG-3 =

History

United States
- Name: YAG-3
- Builder: Hong Kong and Whampoa Dock Company Ltd., Hong Kong
- Yard number: 629
- Launched: 1926
- Sponsored by: North Negros Sugar Company Ltd.
- Acquired: acquired by the U.S. Navy, 25 June 1941
- Stricken: 22 February 1943
- Honours and awards: 1 Battle Stars; American Defense Service Medal; Asiatic-Pacific Campaign Medal; World War II Victory Medal; Philippine Defense Medal
- Fate: Sunk, March 1942-May 1942

General characteristics
- Tonnage: 221 GRT
- Length: 120.0 ft (36.6 m) o/a
- Beam: 24.1 ft (7.3 m)
- Draught: 8.5 ft (2.6 m)
- Installed power: 160 bhp (120 kW)
- Propulsion: one Atlas 4-cylinder diesel engine

USS YAG-3 was a miscellaneous auxiliary service craft of the United States Navy that served during World War II.

== History ==
She was built by the Hong Kong and Whampoa Dock Company Ltd. in Hong Kong for the benefit of the North Negros Sugar Company Ltd. in Manapla, Iloilo, Philippines. She was steel-hulled. She was launched in 1926 as the MV Paz II. On 25 June 1941, the United States Navy purchased her from the North Negros Sugar Company and designated her as a Miscellaneous Auxiliary Service Craft (YAG). She was assigned to the Cavite Navy Yard, 16th Naval District. On 25 October 1941, she began a conversion to a minesweeper which was expected to be completed by 15 December 1941. Although some sources indicate that she was attacked and destroyed by enemy aircraft during the Japanese attack on Cavite Navy Yard on 10 December 1941, 16th Fleet records refer to a USS Paz II that was still active in March 1942 and it is believed that she was sunk sometime during or before the Battle of Corregidor in May 1942. She was struck from the Naval List on 22 February 1943.

She was awarded one battle star.
