= USS Banaag =

History

United States Navy
- Name: Banaag
- Namesake: "Dawn" in Tagalog
- Builder: Hong Kong and Whampoa Dock Company Ltd., Hong Kong
- Launched: 1910
- Completed: 1910
- Commissioned: 1 February 1911
- Stricken: 24 July 1942
- Identification: Hull number: YT-104
- Honours and awards: American Defense Service Medal; Asiatic-Pacific Campaign Medal; World War II Victory Medal; Philippine Defense Medal
- Fate: believed destroyed, 25 December 1941

General characteristics
- Tonnage: 125 GRT
- Length: 96 ft (29 m) o/a
- Beam: 16 ft (4.9 m)
- Draught: 7.5 ft (2.3 m)
- Propulsion: steam, single screw
- Armament: 1 x 3-pounder gun

USS Banaag (YT-104) was a harbor tug of the United States Navy that served during World War II.

== History ==
She was laid down at the Hong Kong shipyard of Hong Kong and Whampoa Dock Company Ltd. as a copper-sheathed composite hull tug for the benefit of the United States Navy. On 1 February 1911, she was delivered and commissioned at the Olongapo Naval Station, 16th Naval District, United States Asiatic Fleet. On 17 July 1920, she was designated as District Harbor Tug YT-104. She is believed to have been destroyed during the Japanese occupation of the Olongapo Naval Station on 25 December 1941. Her 3-pounder gun had previously been removed and given to the 4th Marine Regiment during the Battle of Bataan.

On 24 July 1942, she was struck from the Naval Register and listed as "lost due to enemy occupation".
