= SS Taiping (1925) =

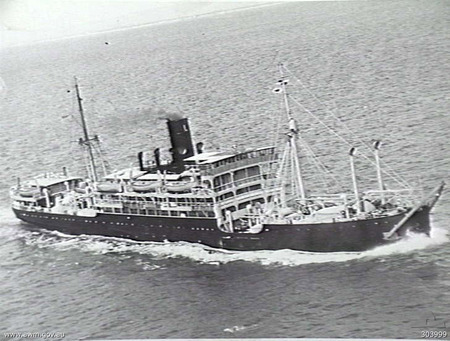
- SS Taiping - Fitted out for wartime merchant marine service with an Anti-Mine netting boom fitted to the bow. Circa 1944-1946

History
- Name: Taiping
- Owner: Australian Oriental Line
- Builder: Hong Kong and Whampoa Dock Company, Hong Kong
- Yard number: 619
- Launched: 11 June 1925
- Fate: Broken up in 1961

General characteristics
- Type: Passenger-cargo
- Length: 352.3 ft (107.4 m)
- Beam: 48.2 ft (14.7 m)
- Depth of hold: 23.7 ft (7.2 m)
- Propulsion: Triple expansion engine
- Speed: 13 knots (24 km/h; 15 mph)

SS Taiping was a 4,324 ton steamship launched by the Hong Kong and Whampoa Dock Company, Hong Kong in 1925 for the Australian Oriental Line.

== Design and construction ==
Taiping was the second of two sister passenger-cargo liners ordered in May 1924 from the Hong Kong and Whampoa Dock Company by the Australian Oriental Line, which was owned and managed by G. S. Yuill & Company, Sydney, New South Wales. With a tonnages of 4,324 GRT and 2,582 NRT, she was 352.3 ft (107.4 m) long, had a beam of 48.2 ft (14.7 m) and a depth of 23.7 ft (7.22 m). Three oil-fired boilers supplied steam at 200psi to a triple expansion steam engine with a rating of 638 NHP, driving a single propeller. Service speed was 13 knots.

Cargo capacity was 4,000 DWT, of which 400 tons was refrigerated. There was accommodation for 278 passengers (40 x 1st, 56 x 2nd class, 182 deck passengers)

The shipyard launched Taiping on 11 June 1925, but completion was delayed due to strikes by both port and shipyard workers.

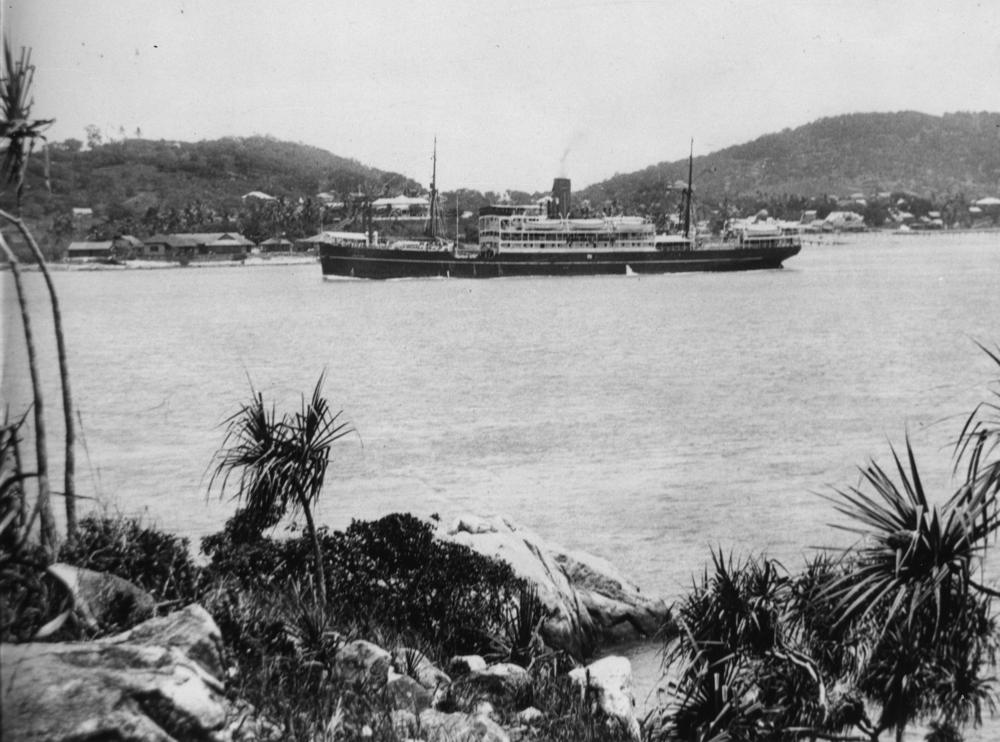
El Taiping c. 1935

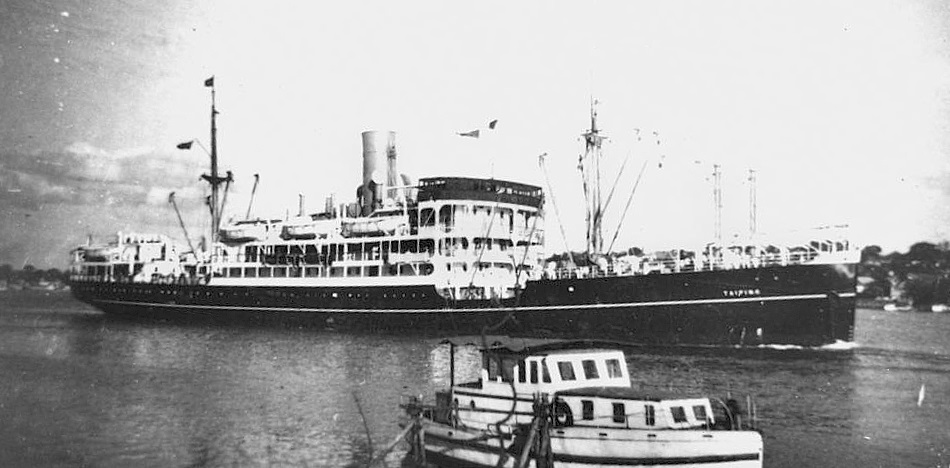
El Taiping in 1953

== See also ==
Sister ship Changte
