= HMAS Gladstone (J324) =

1942 Bathurst-class corvette

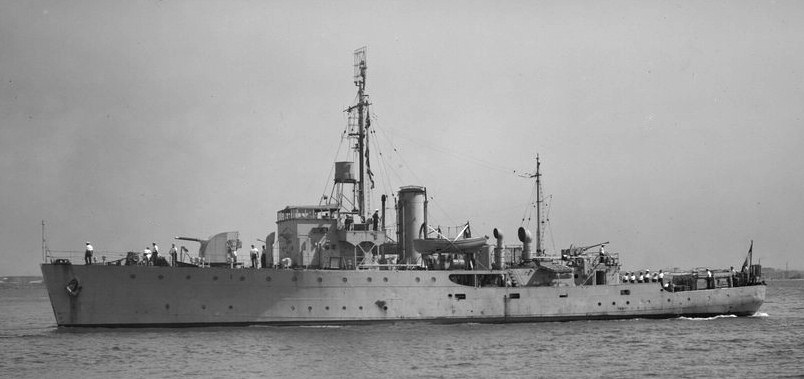
- HMAS Gladstone

History

Australia
- Namesake: City of Gladstone, Queensland
- Builder: Walkers Limited
- Laid down: 4 August 1942
- Launched: 26 November 1942
- Commissioned: 22 March 1943
- Decommissioned: 16 July 1956
- Reclassified: Training ship (1946)
- Honours and awards: Battle honours: Pacific 1943–45; New Guinea 1943–44
- Fate: Entered civilian service in 1956, scrapped in 1983
- Badge

General characteristics
- Class & type: Bathurst-class corvette
- Displacement: 650 tons (standard), 1,025 tons (full war load)
- Length: 186 feet (57 m)
- Beam: 31 feet (9.4 m)
- Draught: 8.5 feet (2.6 m)
- Propulsion: 2 × Yarrow boilers, 2 × triple expansion steam engines, 2 shafts, 2,000 hp
- Speed: 15 knots (28 km/h; 17 mph)
- Complement: 85
- Armament: 1 × 4-inch HA gun; 3 × 20 mm Oerlikons; 1 × Bofors 40 mm L/60 gun (installed later); Machine guns; Depth charges, chutes and throwers

HMAS Gladstone (J324/M324), named for the city of Gladstone, Queensland, was one of 60 Bathurst-class corvettes constructed during World War II, and one of 36 that were initially manned and commissioned solely by the Royal Australian Navy (RAN). Built by Walkers Limited, the ship was commissioned in 1943.

Gladstone initially operated as a convoy escort between Queensland and New Guinea. On 18 December 1943, the ship was part of a convoy that ran aground on Bougainville Reef; the corvette was able to refloat herself and sail back to Brisbane, but remained in port for repairs until January 1944. She resumed convoy duties, first back in Queensland waters, then she was relocated to Milne Bay in April 1944. In January 1945, she was redeployed to Morotai. After World War II, Gladstone was involved in the Japanese surrender of Timor at Koepang, performed surveillance in the Lesser Sunda Islands, and transported Netherlands East Indies soldiers from Darwin to Timor, then spent the next ten years attached to Flinders Naval Depot as a training ship.

The corvette was paid off in 1946, then purchased by the Port Phillip Sea Pilots Association for use as a relief and accommodation ship. She was renamed Akuna (sometimes referred to as Akuna II) and registered in Melbourne. Akuna began operations in mid-1958, but was made redundant in the 1970s by the move to high-powered launches, and was sold to a private owner in 1973 or 1974. Conflicting reports mark the next few years of the ship's operation, until she was sold in 1978 to a new owner, who used her to rescue Vietnamese refugees in the South China Sea and Gulf of Thailand under the auspices of Food for the Hungry International. The ship was re-registered as a Panamian-flagged private yacht under the name Akuna II in 1980, around the time a former United States Air Force pilot began scamming families of personnel missing-in-action after the Vietnam War with claims that he would use the ship to rescue US prisoners-of-war that may still have been interred in Vietnam. Akuna II was not used for that purpose and actually spent the time moored in Songkhla, before she was towed to Bangkok and scrapped in 1983.

== Design and construction ==
In 1938, the Australian Commonwealth Naval Board (ACNB) identified the need for a general purpose 'local defence vessel' capable of both anti-submarine and mine-warfare duties, while easy to construct and operate. The vessel was initially envisaged as having a displacement of approximately 500 tons, a speed of at least 10 knots (19 km/h; 12 mph), and a range of 2,000 nautical miles (3,700 km; 2,300 mi) The opportunity to build a prototype in the place of a cancelled Bar-class boom defence vessel saw the proposed design increased to a 680-ton vessel, with a 15.5 knots (28.7 km/h; 17.8 mph) top speed, and a range of 2,850 nautical miles (5,280 km; 3,280 mi), armed with a 4-inch gun, equipped with asdic, and able to fitted with either depth charges or minesweeping equipment depending on the planned operations: although closer in size to a sloop than a local defence vessel, the resulting increased capabilities were accepted due to advantages over British-designed mine warfare and anti-submarine vessels. Construction of the prototype HMAS Kangaroo did not go ahead, but the plans were retained. The need for locally built 'all-rounder' vessels at the start of World War II saw the "Australian Minesweepers" (designated as such to hide their anti-submarine capability, but popularly referred to as "corvettes") approved in September 1939, with 60 constructed during the course of the war: 36 (including Gladstone) ordered by the RAN, 20 ordered by the British Admiralty but manned and commissioned as RAN vessels, and 4 for the Royal Indian Navy.

As constructed, Gladstone had a displacement of 650 tons, a length of 186 feet (57 m), a beam of 31 feet (9.4 m), and a draught of 8.5 feet (2.6 m). Propulsion was provided by two Yarrow water-tube boilers feeding steam to two triple expansion steam engine, which provided 1,000 indicated horsepower each to the corvette's two propeller shafts. The ship's maximum speed was 15 knots (28 km/h; 17 mph), while its armament consisted of one 4-inch HA gun, three 20 mm Oerlikons (later supplemented by a 40 mm Bofors), machine guns, and depth charges, chutes and throwers. The designated ship's company was 85 strong.

Gladstone was laid down by Walkers Limited at Maryborough, Queensland on 4 August 1942. She was launched on 26 November 1942 by Mrs. Watson, wife of a dockyard employee, and was commissioned into the RAN on 22 March 1943.

== RAN operational history ==
After entering active service in April 1943, Gladstone was assigned as a convoy escort between Queensland ports and New Guinea. On 18 December 1943, Gladstone and sister ships Gympie and Stawell were escorting the eight troopships of convoy TN 192 when the convoy ran aground at 21:30 on Bougainville Reef (part of the Great Barrier Reef). Glenelg and seven of the merchant vessels grounded on the reef: the corvette was able to refloat without assistance despite damaging her starboard propeller, and at 07:00 the next morning escorted three merchantman that had also been refloated back to Brisbane, where she underwent repairs until January 1944.

At that time, the corvette resumed convoy escort duties until March 1944, when she was sent to Adelaide for refit. After the refit, Gladstone sailed to Milne Bay, arriving on 29 April 1944. Excluding a short deployment to Australian waters in October 1944, she served as a convoy escort and anti-submarine patrol ship in the waters around Milne Bay until January 1945, when she was redeployed to Morotai for similar duties. In May, Gladstone and a group of United States Navy PT boats bombarded Japanese barges off Halmahera.

The corvette's wartime service was recognised with two battle honours: "Pacific 1943–49" and "New Guinea 1943–44".

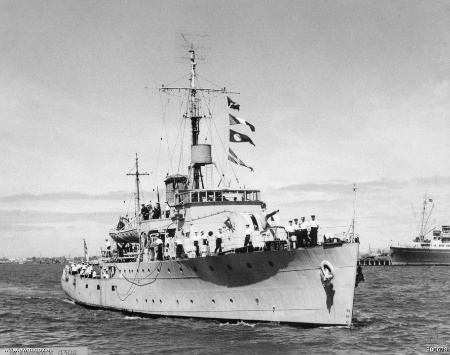
HMAS Gladstone in 1949

After the end of World War II, Gladstone was involved in the Japanese surrender of Timor at Koepang, performed surveillance in the Lesser Sunda Islands, and transported Netherlands East Indies soldiers from Darwin to Timor. In early December 1945, Gladstone sailed for Sydney, visiting her namesake city en route. After a refit, the corvette arrived at Flinders Naval Depot on 23 February 1946, where she was reclassified as a training ship attached to the depot.

== Decommissioning and post-military career ==
HMAS Gladstone's ship's bell on display at the Seaworks Maritime Museum in 2026

Gladstone paid off from military service on 16 July 1956, having sailed 195,642 nautical miles (362,329 km; 225,141 mi) since commissioning. The ship was sold to the Port Phillip Sea Pilots Association for use as a relief and accommodation ship. In this role, she was renamed Akuna (sometimes referred to as Akuna II, as the association had previously operated the former HMAS Una under this name from 1925 to 1957) and registered with Melbourne as her home port. Each of the over 40 maritime pilots in the association owned shares in the vessel, and they took weekly turns as Master and Pilot in Charge. A raised poop deck was installed to add accommodation space. Akuna began operations in mid-1958. By the 1970s, the Port Phillip Sea Pilots Association had made the decision to use high-powered launches and Akuna was no longer needed.

The ship was sold into private ownership for use as a motor yacht, either in November 1973 or March 1974. Reports of the ship's operations in the next few years are conflicting: Akuna may have been used for charter cruises in Port Phillip, or sailed to Brisbane via Sydney for an aborted youth training scheme.

In September 1978, the ship was sold to a Canadian man for use by Food for the Hungry International. Despite being sold to a Canadian owner, British Commonwealth agreements allowed the ship to retain Australian registry. After a boiler refit, the ship relocated to Singapore and began operating in the South China Sea and Gulf of Thailand, rescuing Vietnamese refugees from boats and transporting them to shore. Several countries in the region refused the ship entry, and the Australian government persuaded the owner to change the ship's registry, as they did not want to be held responsible for any refugees rescued by an Australian-flagged vessel not under their control. The ship was re-registered as a Panamian-flagged private yacht under the name Akuna II on 4 February 1980. Around this time, a former United States Air Force pilot claimed to have purchased the ship from Food for the Hungry, and that he was using it to rescue US prisoners-of-war that were still interred in Vietnam. The pilot mass-mailed letters to families of missing-in-action soldiers asking for money to fund the rescue operations, but was later determined to be a money-making scam. Around the same time as the mass-mailing, the US government was informed that Akuna II was moored in Songkhla, having been there for about two years, with a two-man skeleton crew who lived aboard but knew nothing about how to operate or maintain the ship.

The ship was towed to Bangkok in 1983 and broken up for scrap.
