= HMAS Rockhampton =

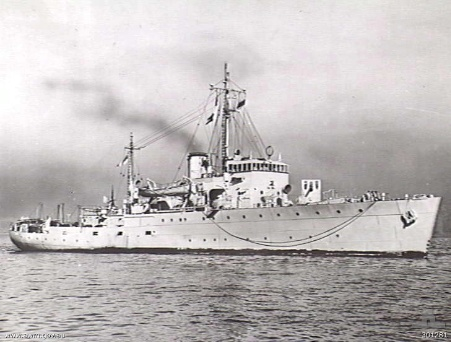
- HMAS Rockhampton in Sydney Harbour during 1944

History

Australia
- Namesake: City of Rockhampton, Queensland
- Builder: Walkers Limited in Maryborough, Queensland
- Laid down: 6 November 1940
- Launched: 26 June 1941
- Commissioned: 21 January 1942
- Decommissioned: 5 August 1946
- Honours and awards: Battle honours: Pacific 1942–45; New Guinea 1944
- Fate: Sold for scrap in 1961, scrapped in 1962
- Badge

General characteristics
- Class & type: Bathurst-class corvette
- Displacement: 650 tons (standard), 1,025 tons (full war load)
- Length: 186 ft (57 m)
- Beam: 31 ft 1.5 in (9.487 m)
- Draught: 8.5 ft (2.6 m)
- Propulsion: triple expansion engine, 2 shafts
- Speed: 15 knots (28 km/h; 17 mph) at 1,750 hp
- Complement: 85
- Armament: 1 × QF 12-pounder gun; 3 × Oerlikon 20 mm cannons; Machine guns; Depth charges chutes and throwers

HMAS Rockhampton (J203/M203), named for the city of Rockhampton, Queensland, was one of 60 Bathurst-class corvettes constructed during World War II, and one of 36 initially manned and commissioned solely by the Royal Australian Navy (RAN).

== Design and construction ==
In 1938, the Australian Commonwealth Naval Board (ACNB) identified the need for a general purpose 'local defence vessel' capable of both anti-submarine and mine-warfare duties, while easy to construct and operate. The vessel was initially envisaged as having a displacement of approximately 500 tons, a speed of at least 10 knots (19 km/h; 12 mph), and a range of 2,000 nautical miles (3,700 km; 2,300 mi) The opportunity to build a prototype in the place of a cancelled Bar-class boom defence vessel saw the proposed design increased to a 680-ton vessel, with a 15.5 knots (28.7 km/h; 17.8 mph) top speed, and a range of 2,850 nautical miles (5,280 km; 3,280 mi), armed with a 4-inch gun, equipped with asdic, and able to fitted with either depth charges or minesweeping equipment depending on the planned operations: although closer in size to a sloop than a local defence vessel, the resulting increased capabilities were accepted due to advantages over British-designed mine warfare and anti-submarine vessels. Construction of the prototype HMAS Kangaroo did not go ahead, but the plans were retained. The need for locally built 'all-rounder' vessels at the start of World War II saw the "Australian Minesweepers" (designated as such to hide their anti-submarine capability, but popularly referred to as "corvettes") approved in September 1939, with 60 constructed during the course of the war: 36 (including Rockhampton) ordered by the RAN, 20 ordered by the British Admiralty but manned and commissioned as RAN vessels, and 4 for the Royal Indian Navy.

Rockhampton had a slightly wider beam than other Bathurst class corvettes; 1.5 inches (38 mm) greater.

Rockhampton was laid down by Walkers Limited at Maryborough, Queensland on 6 November 1940, launched on 26 June 1941, and commissioned into the RAN on 21 January 1942.

== Operational history ==
Rockhampton began her career as a convoy escort along the east coast of Australia. Following a series of Japanese submarine attacks along the east coast of Australia, a convoy system was established. Rockhampton and USS Selfridge escorted the first Sydney to Brisbane convoy. The corvette remained in this role until January 1944, when she began escorting convoys to and from New Guinea. She underwent refit in Sydney over April and May 1944, before returning to escort duties in New Guinea waters. Rockhampton operated in both Australian and New Guinea waters up until the end of World War II.

Following the end of the war, Rockhampton was involved in the rescue of Dutch and Indonesian prisoners-of-war and the occupation of Ambon. On 8 October 1945, the corvette carried the Sultan of Ternate on his return home. Rockhampton returned to Sydney in November 1945, where she was assigned to minesweeping duties off the east coast of Australia. She later participated in survey duties off the coast of South Australia, before returning to Sydney on 29 April 1946.

The corvette received two battle honours for her wartime service: "Pacific 1942–45" and "New Guinea 1944".

== Fate ==
Rockhampton paid off to reserve on 5 August 1946, and was sold to Kino Shito (Australia) Pty Ltd for scrap on 6 January 1961. She departed Australia for Japan under tow by the tug Benton Maru in 1962.
