= SS Changte =

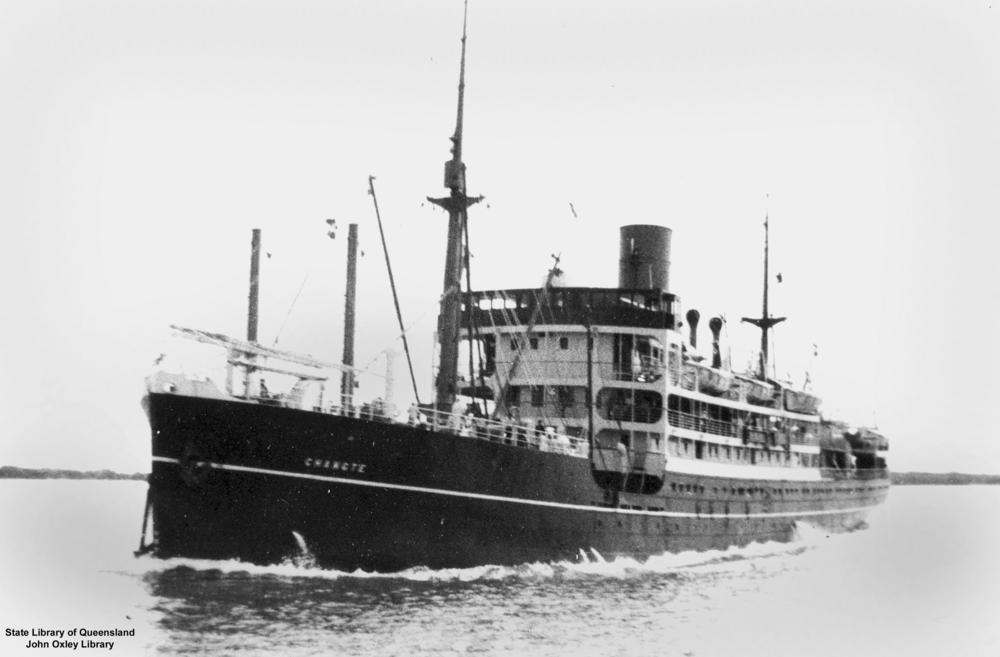
- SS Changte

History
- Name: Changte
- Owner: Australian Oriental Line
- Builder: Hong Kong & Whampoa Dock Company, Hong Kong
- Launched: 1925
- Fate: Broken up in 1961.

General characteristics
- Length: 352.3 ft (107.4 m)
- Beam: 48.2 ft (14.7 m)
- Draught: 23.7 ft (7.2 m)
- Propulsion: Triple expansion engine
- Speed: 13 knots (24 km/h; 15 mph)

Changte was a 4,324-ton steamship built by Hong Kong and Whampoa Dock Company, Hong Kong in 1925 for the Australian Oriental Line.

== Baby Born at Sea ==
The Argus (Melbourne, 11 September 1936) "Changte How Lum" After 12 years in the Australian trade, during which she has made 72 round voyages between Melbourne and Hong Kong, the Australian-Oriental liner S.S. Changte arrived at Victoria Dock yesterday after a voyage that made history for the ship. A baby boy was born aboard the vessel when it was steaming through the Banda Sea from Manila to Thursday Island. The ship's surgeon (Dr. J. S. MaCfarlan) and the stewardess. (Miss E. Farrell) were called to a cabin occupied by Mrs. William ("Munsok") How Lum, a Chinese passenger traveling from Hong Kong (via Zhongshan, Guangdong, China) to Townsville (Qld). They later reported that a baby boy had been born and that mother and child were well.

The christening ceremony was performed by the commander (Captain P. Gambrill), and the many passengers who attended were delighted when the mother chose the name of the ship for her infant son. Captain Gambrill then formally entered in the ship's log-book the details or the historic incident, and presented the child with a silver christening cup and a silver spoon, both inscribed with the child's name Changte How Lum (known as Frederick How Lum).

== Operational history ==
Changte was requisitioned by the Royal Navy as a Naval Stores Issuing Ship on 27 August 1939 and was known as RFA Changte (Y1-9). She was returned to her owners in 1946.

== Fate ==
Changte was broken up at Hong Kong in August 1961.

MYSTERY AND TRAGEDY, THE VOYAGE OF THE CHANGTE. TWO PEOPLE DISAPPEAR. During the voyage of the Changte from Hong Kong to Sydney a lady passenger and an officer disappeared at different times, and were not seen again. Sydney, 2 May. When Captain Gambrill took the liner Changte to sea from Hong Kong on Friday, 13 April, he and his crew paid little heed to the old marine superstition regarding sailing on that day of the week, but before Sydney was reached to-day all hands on board had reason to regard their sailing day as the blackest Friday in their experience. Two mysterious deaths occurred on the voyage, and not a clue to the disappearance of the deceased persons could be traced. In northern waters an elderly English lady passenger, who was travelling round the world with Miss Jean Mackenzie, her young niece, kissed her protege good-night as usual and read a prayer before retiring at 10 o'clock' one evening. No one ever saw her again, and an examination of her personal effects established no suggestion of a motive for her disappearance. It was concluded that she walked in her sleep and fell overboard. This tragedy was followed by a fatality equally uncanny. The third officer, Mr. J. A. Allan, vanished off the Australian coast. He was seen by the quartermaster smoking in his cabin about an hour after he was relieved on the bridge at midnight by the second officer. Then he disappeared without a word or sign. He had been on the ship for some time, and was highly respected and popular. He had a substantial bank balance, in addition to a private income, and so far as any of his colleagues knew he had no trouble in the world.
