= Australian Oriental Line =

Shipping company between Sydney, Japan and Hong Kong

House flag used by Australian Oriental Line

The Australian Oriental Line was a shipping company that operated between Sydney, Japan and Hong Kong. It was formed in 1912 by G.S. Yuill & Company. The company closed in 1961 due to the high costs of acquiring new vessels or refitting the existing fleet.

== Ships of the Australian Oriental Line ==
- SS Guthrie
- SS Changsha
- SS Taiyuan
- SS Changte
- SS Taiping
