= SS Japara (1930) =

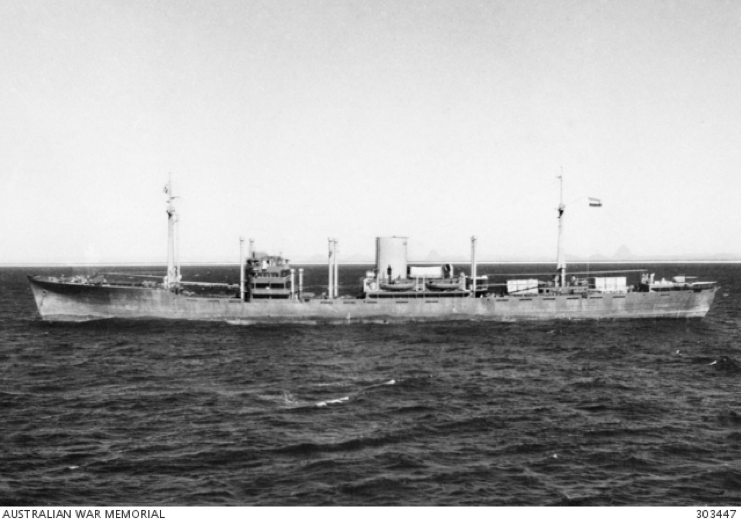
- Port side view of the Dutch motor vessel Japara which transported troops to Milne Bay in 1942-09. Between 1942–12 and 1943-06 she took part in Operation Lilliput in northern New Guinea.

History
- Name: SS Japara; 1958 Davric; 1963 Phoenix; 1966 East Head; 1967 Arrow Head; 1968 Moji Trader; 1969 Victory
- Owner: Koninklijke Paketvaart-Maatschappij
- Launched: 1930

General characteristics
- Type: Cargo ship
- Tonnage: 3,323 GRT
- Length: 323 ft 0 in (98.5 m)
- Beam: 48 ft 2 in (14.7 m)
- Draft: 20 ft 5 in (6.2 m)
- Installed power: 233 Nominal horsepower (nhp)
- Propulsion: Triple expansion engine

SS Japara was a freighter of 3,323 GRT built by Mach. Fabr. & Scheepswerf P. Smit Jr., Rotterdam in 1930 and operated by Koninklijke Paketvaart-Maatschappij (KPM) in the Dutch East Indies trade. The 1930 Japara was operating with the United States Army permanent local fleet of the U.S. Army Forces in Australia (USAFIA) from 1942 until 1945 even while the larger ship, 9,312 GRT MS Japara (1938), was active in Army service oceanwide. (Note: The larger, newer MS Japara of 9,312 GRT of 1938 was in operation on oceanic routes and associated with the U.S. Army with occasional operations in the Southwest Pacific area. Japara without date, tonnage or other distinguishing characteristics may be confusing in wartime accounts. That ship was delivered to the War Shipping Administration on 13 December 1941 and was allocated to and operated under Army Transportation Corps charter agreement, redelivered to Rotterdamsche Lloyd for charter to the Transportation Corps and then, in 1946, under Netherlands Ministry of Shipping, again placed under charter to the U.S. Army Transportation Corps (MARAD Vessel Status Card).) Japara of 1930 played an important logistics role in the New Guinea Campaign.

== World War II ==
Japara was one of twenty-one KPM vessels that took refuge in Australian ports after the fall of Java that Dutch officials requested be put into service for the war effort. The ship, among others, was chartered by the Chief Quartermaster, U.S. Army Forces in Australia (USAFIA) on 26 March 1942 with long term details to be negotiated at higher levels to become part of the U.S. Army's local fleet crewed by its KPM officers and men with an Army local fleet number of X-18 being assigned until released from the fleet May 1945.

Japara and SS Van Heemskerk escorted by HMAS Arunta were due in Milne Bay on the evening of 11 September, days after the surface raid that had sunk MV Anshun, when reports of another possible surface raid developing caused the convoy to hold until the morning of 12 September when it entered Milne Bay at about six in the morning. The transports finished unloading and departed for Townsville under escort of Arunta and HMAS Stuart on 15 September.

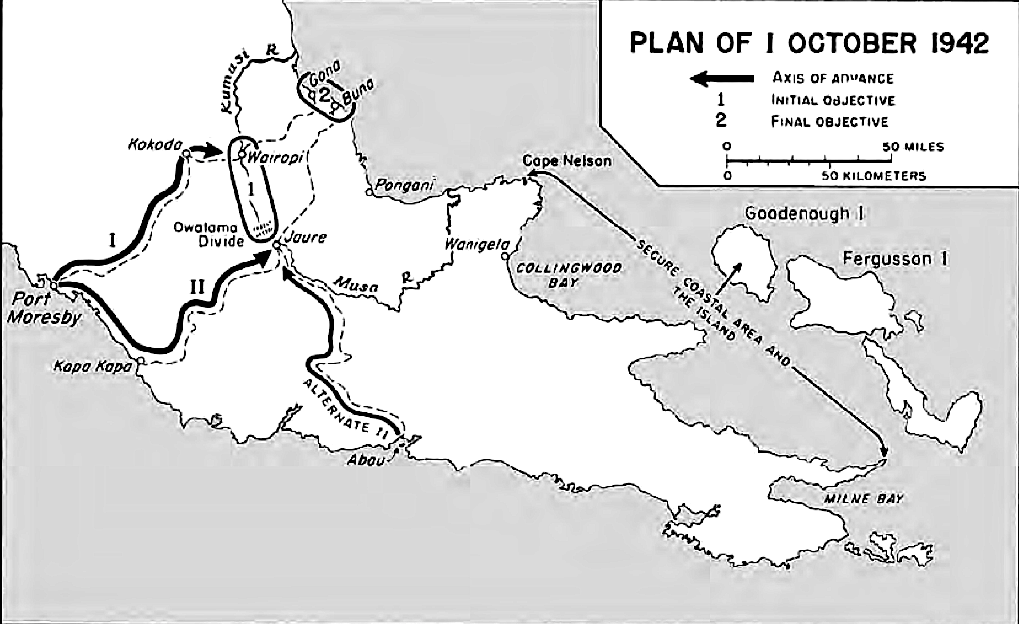
LILLIPUT area of operations.

Logistical support of Allied offensive operations on the north coast of New Guinea by sea required establishment of a port west of Milne Bay at Oro Bay and a route by which large ships could pass through the largely uncharted and hazardous waters between. Small vessels transporting supplies in the early stages and survey vessels found that route and convoys code named Operation Lilliput were put into place to run two large ships under escort of one or two corvettes to Oro Bay in what were termed "flights" and given numbers. Japara was in a convoy of nine ships that departed Townsville 15 November 1942 that split on 17 November into a contingent going to Port Moresby and four, Japara, Balikpapan, Bantam and J. B. Ashe under escort of corvettes headed to Milne Bay with the three Dutch ships to become the first "flights" of Lilliput.

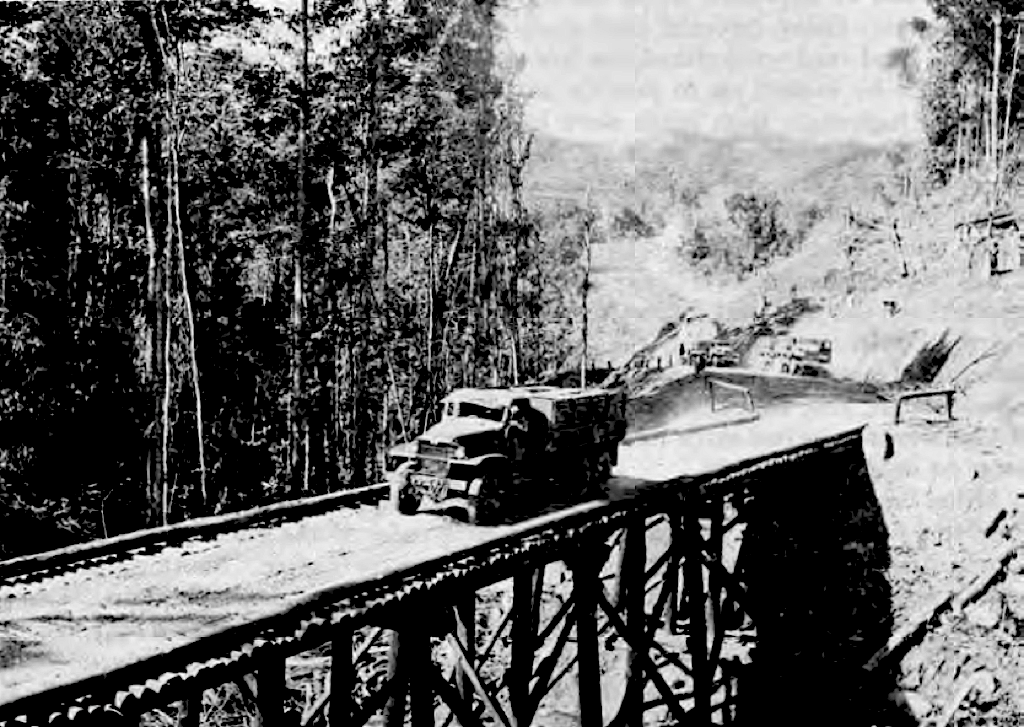
A section of the Oro Bay-Dobodura road.

Japara, escorted by HMAS Lithgow, departed Oro Bay on 18 December on the voyage starting Operation Lilliput transporting U.S. Army port and engineer troops from Gili Gili at Milne Bay to Oro Bay that were to establish a functioning port and to construct a road from that shipping terminus to the new airfields at Dobodura which would make it possible to support and base bombers and fighters north of the Owen Stanley Range. The ship arrived with the troops, 750 tons of cargo, Australian pontoon barges to form a new docking facility and the Commander, Combined Operational Service Command (COSC) detachment for Oro Bay that would operate the growing port on the night of 19 December and was unloaded and away from danger by daylight. Japara returned to Oro Bay on the night of 26 December with the remainder of the U.S. troops to operate the port and build the Dobodura road and a troop of Stuart light tanks to supplement those arriving earlier in Karsik and two brought in by Bantam on 23 December.

== Fate ==
Japara was sold in 1958 to Wheelock & Marden & Co., Panama and renamed Davric. She was sold in 1963 renamed Phoenix, sold in 1966 renamed East Head, sold in 1967 renamed Arrow Head, sold in 1968 renamed Moji Trader and lastly sold in 1969 and renamed Victory which was scrapped in Hong Kong in 1969.
