= MS Van Heutsz (1926) =

Dutch cargo ship

- Van Heutz at anchor in Jacquinot Bay, New Britain (26 November 1944).

History

Netherlands
- Name: Van Heutsz (1926–1957); Barentsz (1957–1959)
- Owner: N.V. Koninklijke Paketvaart-Maatschappij (1926–1942); Koninklijke Java-China Paketvaart Lijnen B.V. (1942–1947); Koninklijke Java-China Paketvaart Lijnen N.V. (1947–1957); N.V. Koninklijke Paketvaart-Maatschappij (1957–1959)
- Operator: N.V. Koninklijke Paketvaart-Maatschappij (1926–1942); Koninklijke Java-China Paketvaart Lijnen B.V. (1942–1947); Koninklijke Java-China Paketvaart Lijnen N.V. (1947–1957); N.V. Koninklijke Paketvaart-Maatschappij (1957–1959)
- Port of registry: Batavia, Netherlands East Indies (1926-1942); Willemstad, Netherlands Antilles (1942-1947) (Note: The only terriroty under control of the government in exile in London were colonies in the Americas. Ships were therefore registered in there.); Amsterdam, Netherlands (1947-1959)
- Builder: N.V. Koninklijke Maatschappij 'De Schelde', Scheepswerf en Machinefabriek, Flushing, Netherlands
- Launched: 13 March 1926
- Completed: Delivery: November 1926
- Identification: Call sign: TBVJ (1926–1934); PKEG (1934–1947); PIDU (1947–1957); PCYK (1957–1959)
- Fate: Sold for scrap 1959

General characteristics
- Tonnage: 4,588 GRT, 2,749 NRT, 3,740 DWT; 4,552 GRT, 2,678 NRT (1937 re measurement); 4,646 GRT (1947 re measurement)
- Length: 123.44 m (405 ft 0 in) (LOA); 118.95 m (390 ft 3 in) (LBP)
- Beam: 15.90 m (52 ft 2 in)
- Draught: 6.4 m (21 ft 0 in) (registered)
- Depth: 8.23 m (27 ft 0 in) (registered)
- Decks: 3
- Installed power: 2 × 6 cyl. Sulzer diesels, 3,400 bhp (2,500 kW), 2 × screws
- Speed: 13.5 knots (25.0 km/h; 15.5 mph)
- Capacity: Passengers: 2,213-16 first, 60 second, 2,137 deck (1926–1933); 2,207-16 first, 54 second, 2,137 deck (1933–1933); Cargo: 211,000 cu ft (5,974.9 m^{3}) (bale); 229,000 cu ft (6,484.6 m^{3}) (grain)

MS Van Heutsz was a Dutch diesel-powered passenger and cargo vessel of the Koninklijke Paketvaart-Maatschappij (KPM) line operating from Batavia (now Jakarta, Indonesia) in the Dutch East Indies. The ship, as was sister ship Cremer, was designed for the longer routes of the East Indies inter-island trade extending to Singapore and Hong Kong. The ships had limited cabin accommodation for passengers but large deck passenger capacity. Much of the passenger trade was with Chinese moving between China, Singapore and the East Indies.

During World War II with the Netherlands and colonies outside the Americas occupied by Germany or Japan Van Heutsz and over twenty other KPM ships formed the base of the United States Army permanent local fleet in the South West Pacific area under the South West Pacific Area Command for the duration of the war. Van Heutsz was used as a troop transport during the campaigns from Australia up to recapture of islands in the East Indies.

After the war the ship became involved in political and labor disputes related to the emergence of an Indonesian independence movement. The KPM crews were natives of the East Indies with officers Dutch. Crews struck, walked off the ships and Australian labor unions refused to service the ships as they were returning to the East Indies with Dutch troops and arms.

On return Van Heutsz resumed the former route under the Koninklijke Java-China Paketvaart Lijnen N.V. line; however a wave of piracy was sweeping the area and the ship was taken by pirates north of Hong Kong during an afternoon, forced to a new destination and looted through the night into the next morning. Van Heutsz continued those operations until reverting to KPM and being renamed Barentsz in 1957. In 1959 the ship was sold and scrapped in Hong Kong.

== Construction ==
The 4,588 GRT ship was built by N.V. Koninklijke Maatschappij 'De Schelde', Scheepswerf en Machinefabriek, Vlissingen (Flushing), Zeeland, Netherlands. The ship was laid down in April 1925, launched 13 March 1926 and delivered in November.

Van Heutsz was 4,588 GRT, 2,749 NRT, 3,740 DWT, 123.44 m (405 ft 0 in) length overall, 118.95 m (390 ft 3 in) length between perpendiculars with a beam of 15.90 m (52 ft 2 in). Two 6-cylinder Sulzer diesels produced 3,400 brake horsepower (2,500 kW) to drive twin screws for a speed of 13.5 knots (25.0 km/h; 15.5 mph). The ship had three decks with cabin accommodations for 16 first class and 60 second class passengers with space for 2,137 deck passengers. There was 211,000 cu ft (5,974.9 m^{3}) (bale) cargo space.

== History ==
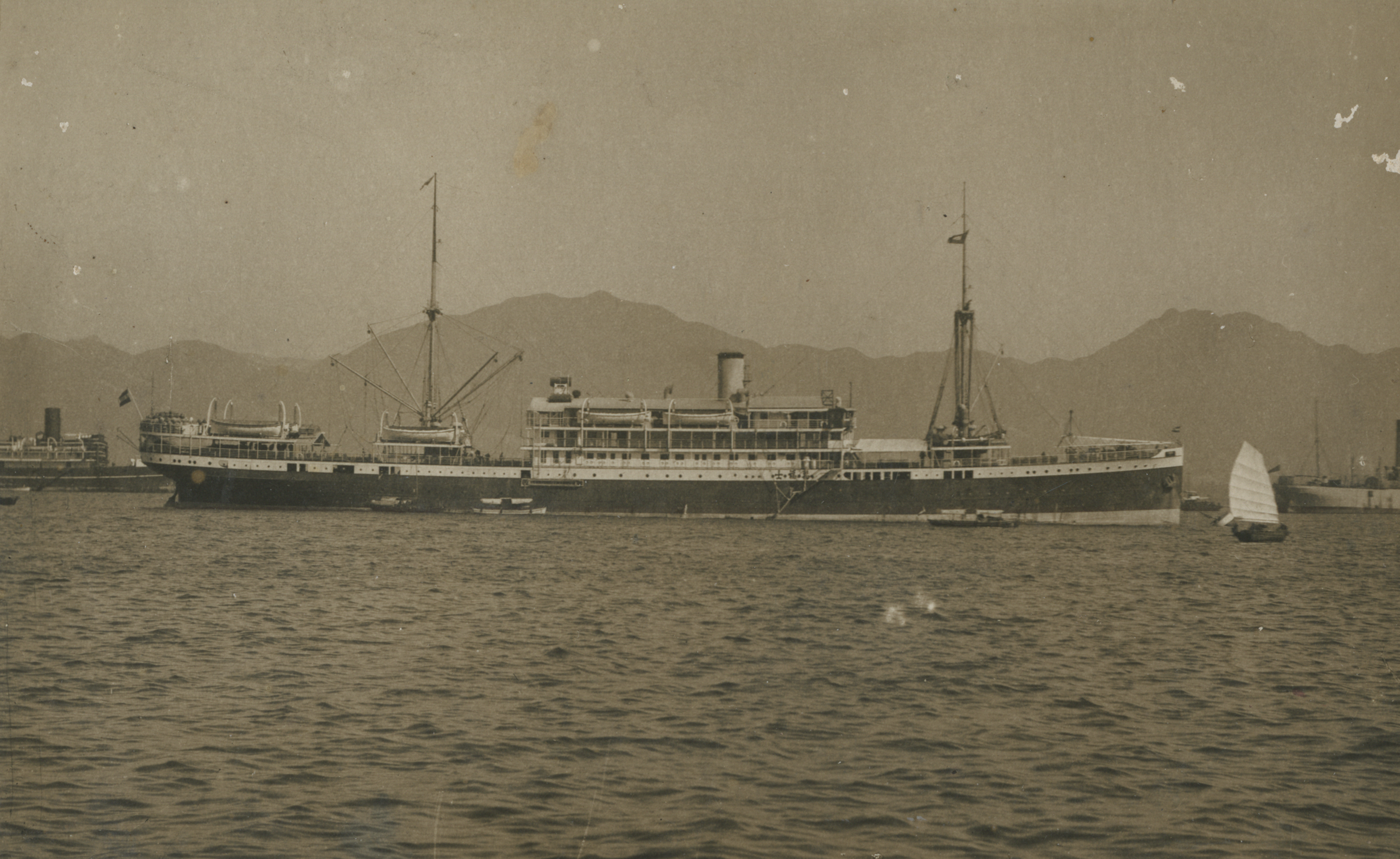
Van Heutsz in Hong Kong, 1928.

The ship began service with Koninklijke Paketvaart-Maatschappij (Royal Packet Navigation Company) commonly KPM on 8 November 1926 serving inter-island routes within the Dutch East and to Singapore, China and Africa. Van Heutsz was assigned to the inter-island, Singapore and China service as was sister ship Cremer.

=== Commercial service 1926—1941 ===
A typical route would include Belawan, Penang, Singapore and Chinese ports such as Shantou (Swatow), Xiamen (Amoy) and Hong Kong on a passage taking three days. Passengers on the China-Singapore route included large numbers of Chinese as deck passengers with 1,933 being noted as an example. Opium smuggling was often a problem with Chandu being found in freight and even crew dropping packages for pick up by small boats during transit.

In the first days of September 1937 the ship was caught in the Great Hong Kong typhoon and was one of twenty large ships driven ashore. On 2 September 1937 Van Heutsz with 60 cabin and 1,200 deck passengers collided with several other ships before being grounded on Green Island, Hong Kong. (Note: A number of the vessels can be seen in List of shipwrecks in 1937 for 2 September.) Passengers and crew were rescued and placed on other ships for passage but the ship was holed in two places requiring major repairs. By 10 September the ship had been refloated and placed on a mudbank until a dry dock became available for permanent repairs.

Between the German invasion and occupation of the Netherlands and outbreak of war in the Pacific the Dutch government-in-exile maintained control of the colonies with KPM and its ships maintaining relatively normal operations. On 8 December 1941 that area was at risk and was quickly occupied by Japan. With the government in exile in London and both the home country and colonies outside the Americas at war and then occupied the ship's registry and corporate entity was changed for the duration to Willemstad, Netherlands Antilles.

=== Wartime service 1941—1945 ===
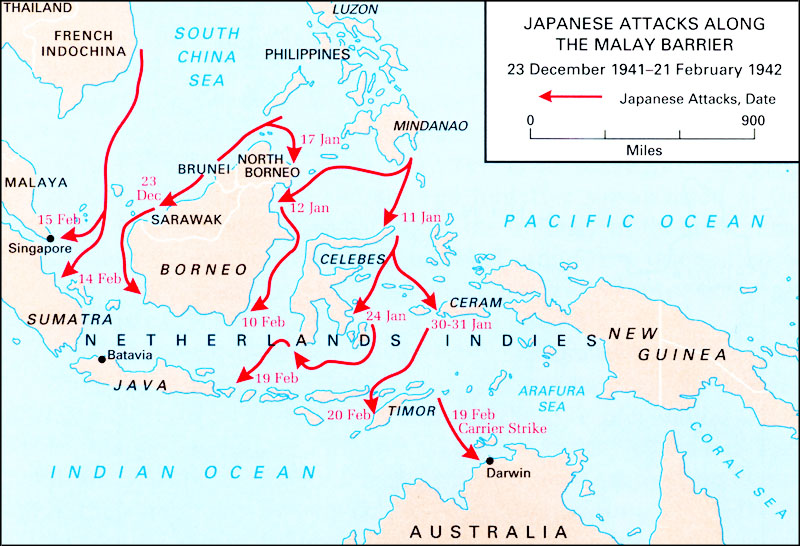
Japanese attacks along the Malay Barrier December 23, 1941 – February 21, 1942.

Japanese attacks on 8 December 1941, the date west of the International Date Line when Pearl Harbor was bombed on the morning of 7 December local time east of the date line, abruptly ended peace in the Pacific. The attacks were widespread and almost simultaneous. The attack on Kota Bharu on the Malay peninsula had occurred before that on Pearl Harbor and, reduced to a common Australian time, all occurred between 0330 and 1000 hours on 8 December and all but the attack in Malaya were air attacks. At Kota Bharu the Japanese were landing forces to begin the campaign to occupy Southeast Asia and the Dutch East Indies. On 8 December 1941 the Netherlands government in exile declared war on Japan with the Governor General in the East Indies issuing a proclamation accepting the challenge to resist Japanese expansion. KPM ships were immediately involved in the defense efforts but despite Allied efforts and the formation of a specific command to defend the Malay Barrier the collapse came quickly.

With the collapse of the defenses the KPM ships, loaded with refugees and some damaged, arrived in Australian ports where they were quickly incorporated into the fleet being assembled by United States Forces in Australia (USFIA), shortly to be redesignated as U.S. Army Forces in Australia (USAFIA) and later the U.S. Army Services of Supply (USASOS). On 26 March 1942 the Chief Quartermaster USAFIA chartered 24 Dutch ships for 45 days while long term arrangements were worked out in London and Washington. The ultimate arrangement was one in which the British Ministry of War Transport working in London with the government in exile would make arrangements for all Dutch commercial ships with those on time charter or long-term charter, as the SWPA fleet, being through a sub arrangement with the U.S. War Shipping Administration. Operationally the SWPA vessels were under "full and complete control" of General MacArthur Van Heutsz was one of those ships and became part of the U.S. Army's permanent local fleet from 26 March 1942 to 1 September 1945 assigned the identifier X-11.

On 18 May 1942, escorted by HNLMS Tromp and HMAS Arunta, Van Heutsz with the Dutch transports Bantam, Bontekoe and Van Heemskerk of convoy "ZK.8" carried 4,735 Australian 14th Brigade troops from Sydney to reinforce Port Moresby. The convoy reached its destination at the end of the month despite Japanese submarine activity in the vicinity of Sydney and the Australian east coast.

Dutch Transport Van Heutsz at Oro Bay, New Guinea.

The ship continued operations between Australia the ports being reinforced and established to defend and then launch the New Guinea campaign. The ship, escorted by HMAS Stuart, arrived in Milne Bay along with West Cactus (Note: West Cactus was a USSB 1019 type ship of 5,581 GRT built by Schaw, Batcher Company, San Francisco in 1919. In the SWPA fleet from 19 May 1942 to March 1945, as X-22.) and Hanyang (Note: One of the Chinese ships acquired by the SWPA fleet early on in January and formally on 24 March 1942 given designation X-8. Hanyang, 2,876 GRT, was one of the few ships actually making an attempt to reinforce the Philippines from Australia, sailing before 2 February before turning back.) around midnight on 17 September 1942. That port was to be the base for the campaigns to the west to secure New Guinea.

A major prelude to that campaign was establishing a new supply route from Milne Bay to Oro Bay through a dangerous inside passage to avoid the Japanese controlled waters to the north. The supply route was established and ships, largely the Dutch vessels, began Operation Lilliput. Van Heutsz was damaged by an air attack on 9 January 1943 while discharging cargo at Oro Bay. One bomb hit the ship and two were near misses.

Headquarters 26 Infantry Brigade Troops Landing From the Van Heutsz, Morotai, Netherlands East Indies.

The ship was routinely engaged in logistics and troop transport during the New Guinea campaign. Then the ship supported the campaigns beyond the main island of New Guinea. On 26 November 1944 Van Heutsz was photographed at Jacquinot Bay, New Britain after transporting troops of the 13th Brigade (Australia) to the area. As the Allied advance moved north the ship returned to home waters including landing Australian troops of the 26th Brigade (Australia) at Morotai in early April 1945.

In September 1945 Van Heutsz was among the last three Dutch SWPA fleet vessels returned to KPM service. The others were Janssens and Maetsuycker.

=== End of war return to Dutch East Indies ===
Before return to the Netherlands East Indies the ship was caught up in postwar independence and labor strife. The ship's seamen were Indonesian and favored independence, refusing to work particularly when the ships were carrying Netherlands troops and arms back to home islands. Australian unions sided with the ship's crews, declaring the ships "black" and thus not to be aided by any unionized entity, including tugs. Crewmen walking off the ships were declared illegal immigrants by the Australian government. As a result, the ships, including Van Heutsz often had to get underway only with the European officers and often military "crew". Thus on 1 October 1945 Van Heutsz departed Brisbane without aid of tugs having been prepared for departure by Dutch military personnel.

=== Post war commercial service ===
Van Heutsz, with registry changed to Amsterdam, began operating with the Koninklijke Java-China Paketvaart Lijnen N.V. (Royal Interocean Line) at the end of 1947 after a charter by Nederlands-Indische Regering from March to October 1946.

The ship resumed its old route to Hong Kong sometimes repatriating Chinese taken in the war and transporting Chinese to Singapore. Smuggling and piracy were a problem with several incidents. The worst was a case in which the ship was held overnight and looted. In the afternoon on 15 December 1947 twenty-five pirates disguised as passengers with arms concealed in luggage took over the ship north of Hong Kong. The pirates held the ship overnight and ordered the captain to put into Honghai Bay where loot and six Chinese first class passengers held for ransom were taken off. The ship was making the first trip without a Dutch military guard. Three of the persons held for ransom were released 19 April 1948 after payment. Police raids on resulted in capture of suspects who were identified by the captain and officers of the ship and some recovery was made of the loot. The last persons held for ransom escaped 1 September 1948 after being held by three gangs in twenty-six locations. The pirates taking over Van Heutsz were part of well organized pirate gangs associated with syndicates reportedly with shareholders among the prominent and reputable businessmen of Singapore and Hong Kong.

Van Heutsz returned to KPM service in 1957 to be renamed Barentsz. In 1959 the ship was sold for scrapping to Chiap Hua Manufacturing Co. Ltd.in Hong Kong.

== See also ==
- Battle of Milne Bay
- Battle of Buna–Gona
- SS Bantam
- SS Karsik
- SS 's Jacob
- SS Tasman

== Bibliography ==
- Bykofsky, Joseph; Larson, Harold (1990). The Technical Services—The Transportation Corps: Operations Overseas. United States Army In World War II. Washington, DC: Center Of Military History, United States Army. LCCN 56060000.
- Gill, G. Hermon (1957). Royal Australian Navy 1939-1942. Australia in the War of 1939–1945. Series 2 – Navy. Vol. 1. Canberra: Australian War Memorial. LCCN 58037940.
- Gill, G. Hermon (1968). Royal Australian Navy 1942-1945. Australia in the War of 1939–1945. Series 2 – Navy. Vol. 2. Canberra: Australian War Memorial. LCCN 76454854.
- Masterson, Dr. James R. (1949). U. S. Army Transportation In The Southwest Pacific Area 1941-1947. Washington, D. C.: Transportation Unit, Historical Division, Special Staff, U. S. Army.
