= SS Van Heemskerk =

Dutch passenger steamship that was built in 1909 and sunk in 1943

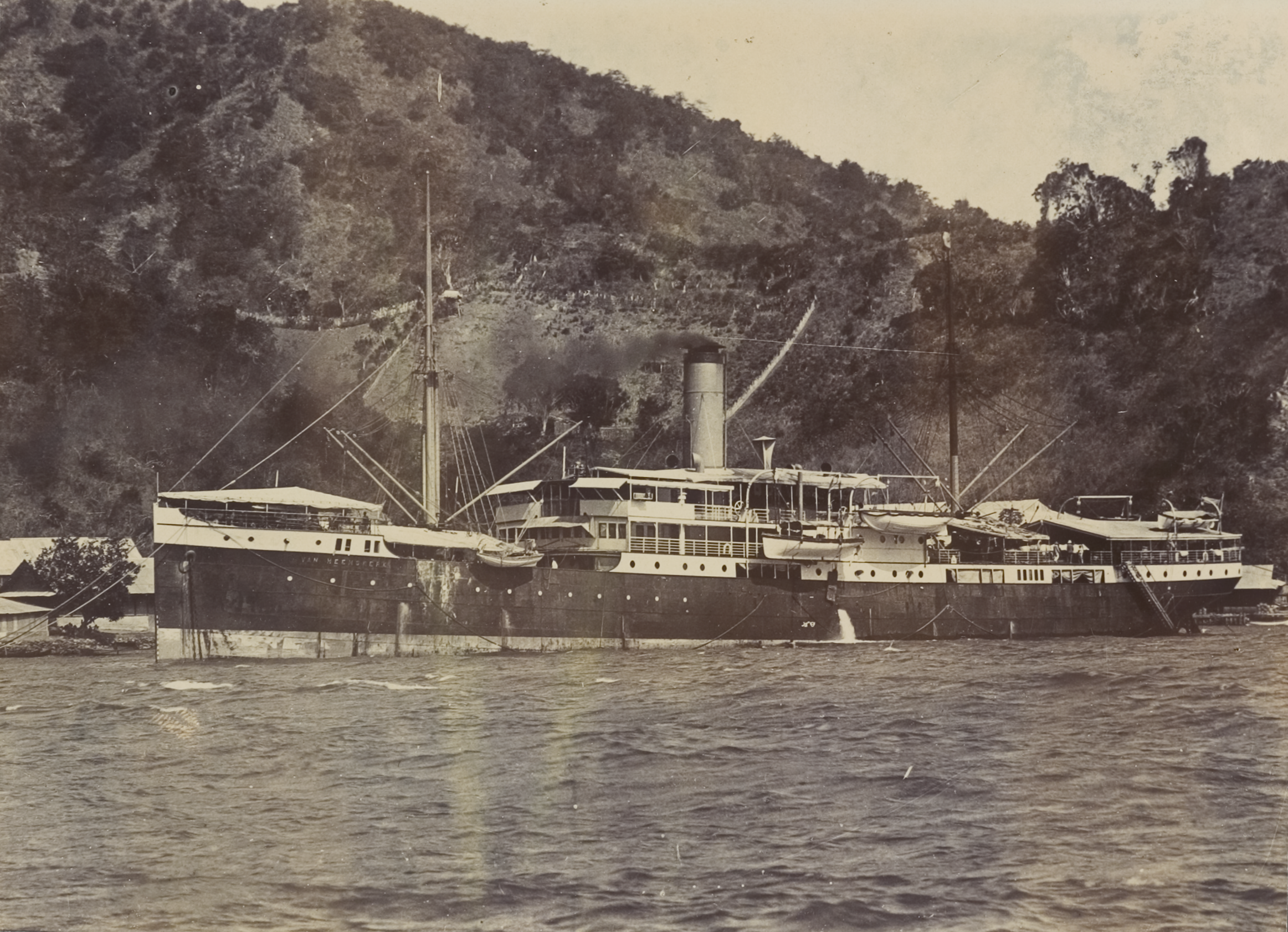
- Van Heemskerk off Gorontalo, about 1910

History
- Name: Van Heemskerk
- Owner: 1909: Koninklijke Paketvaart-Mij; 1918: Shipping Controller; 1919: Koninklijke Paketvaart-Mij
- Operator: 1918: British India SN Co
- Port of registry: 1909: (Netherlands) Batavia; 1918: (United Kingdom) Singapore; 1919: (Netherlands) Batavia
- Builder: Nederlandsche SM, Amsterdam
- Yard number: 100
- Laid down: 5 April 1909
- Launched: 31 August 1909
- Completed: 29 October 1909
- Identification: 1909: code letters TJKG; 1918: UK official number 140132; 1918: code letters TWMK; by 1926: code letters TJDF; by 1934: call sign PKEH
- Fate: Sunk by air attack, 1943

General characteristics
- Type: passenger ship
- Tonnage: 2,996 GRT, 1,896 NRT, 4,377 DWT
- Length: 325.5 ft (99.2 m)
- Beam: 43.8 ft (13.4 m)
- Depth: 25.0 ft (7.6 m)
- Decks: 3
- Installed power: 233 NHP, 1,300 ihp
- Propulsion: 1 × screw; 1 × triple-expansion engine
- Speed: 10 1/2 knots (19.4 km/h)
- Capacity: passengers: 26 × 1st class, 29 × 2nd class, 941 × steerage; cargo: 164,000 cubic feet (4,600 m^{3}) grain, 140,000 cubic feet (4,000 m^{3}) bale
- Armament: 1942: DEMS
- Notes: one of several sister ships

SS Van Heemskerk was a passenger steamship that was launched in the Netherlands in 1909 and sunk by enemy action off New Guinea in 1943. She spent most of her career with Koninklijke Paketvaart-Maatschappij (KPM, the "Royal Packet Navigation Company"), based in the Dutch East Indies.

In the First World War the United Kingdom seized her under angary. In the Second World War she escaped the Japanese invasion of the Dutch East Indies, and became part of the Southwest Pacific Area (SWPA) command's permanent local fleet. A Japanese air attack sank her on 26 June 1943.

== Building ==
Between 1907 and 1914, KPM took delivery of a set of sister ships from different Dutch shipyards. Maatschappij voor Scheeps- en Werktuigbouw Fijenoord in Rotterdam completed 's Jacob in 1907, Le Maire and Van Spilbergen in 1908, Van der Hagen in 1909, Van Waerwijck in 1910, and Sloet van de Beele and Van Imhoff in 1914. Nederlandsche Scheepsbouw Maatschappij (NSM) in Amsterdam completed Van Heemskerk in 1909, Van Linschoten in 1910, and Van Neck in 1912. Rijkee & Co in Rotterdam completed Van Rees in 1913.

NSM built Van Heemskerk as yard number 100. She was launched on 9 December 1909 and completed in February 1910. Her registered length was 325.5 ft (99.2 m), her beam was 443.8 ft (135.3 m) and her depth was 25 ft (7.6 m). Her tonnages were 2,996 GRT, 1,896 NRT, and 4,377 DWT. She had berths for 996 passengers: 26 in first class, 29 in second class, and 941 in steerage. Her holds had capacity for 164,000 cubic feet (4,600 m^{3}) of grain, or 140,000 cubic feet (4,000 m^{3}) of baled cargo.

The ship had a single screw, driven by a three-cylinder triple-expansion steam engine. It was rated at 233 NHP or 1,300 ihp, and gave her a speed of 10 1/2 knots (19.4 km/h).

KPM registered Van Heemskerk at Batavia in the Dutch East Indies. Her code letters were TJKG.

== Career until 1941 ==
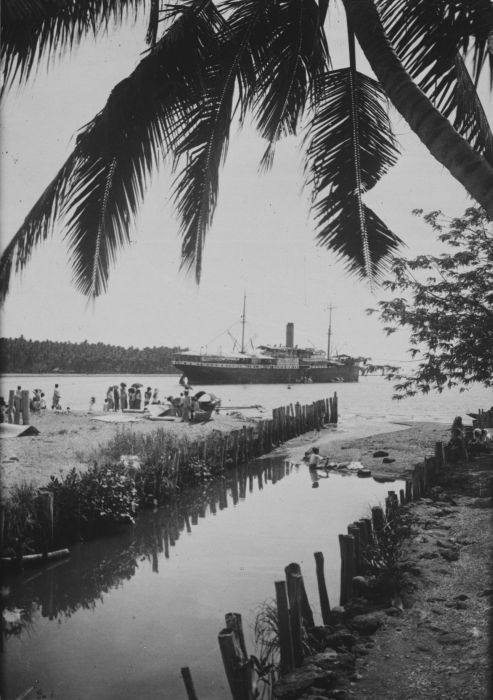
Van Heemskerk in Sanana, about 1921–22

On 20 March 1918 President Woodrow Wilson issued Proclamation 1436, authorising the seizure under angary of Dutch ships in US ports. The UK also seized Dutch ships in ports of the British Isles and the British Empire. Van Heemskerk was seized in Singapore. She was vested in the UK Shipping Controller, who appointed the British India Steam Navigation Company to manage her. She was registered in Singapore, with the UK official number 140132 and code letters TWMK. The ship was returned to her owners in February 1919.

In 1925 Van Heemskerk's code letters were changed to TJDF. In 1934 the call sign PKEH superseded her code letters.

== Second World War ==
On 8 December 1941 Japan invaded the Dutch East Indies. On 1 March 1942 Japanese forces landed on Java. Van Heemskerk was one of 21 KPM ships that reached Australian ports after the fall of Java.

Dutch officials asked that the KPM ships be put into Allied war service. On 26 March 1942 the Chief Quartermaster, US Army Forces in Australia (USAFIA) chartered Van Heemskerk and other KPM ships, with long term details to be negotiated at higher levels, to become part of the United States Army's local fleet. She was crewed by her KPM officers and men, without being given an Army local fleet "X" number.

Van Heemskerk was one of four Dutch ships of Convoy ZK8, which left Sydney on 18 May 1942. The others were Bantam, Bontekoe and Van Heutsz, escorted by HMAS Arunta and HNLMS Tromp. The convoy took 4,735 troops of the Australian 14th Brigade to Port Moresby.

Van Heemskerk continued ferrying troops and materiel between Queensland and New Guinea during the reinforcement and build-up in New Guinea. She sailed with Convoy A2, which left Brisbane on 7 August and went to Fall River; and Convoy PQ3/1, which she joined from Cairns on 6 September and which went to Port Moresby.

Van Heemskerk and Japara, escorted by Arunta, were due in Milne Bay on the evening of 11 September, days after the surface raid that had sunk Anshun. Reports of another possible surface raid developing caused the convoy to hold until the morning of 12 September when it entered Milne Bay at about 06:00 hrs. The ships finished unloading, and on 15 September left for Townsville escorted by Arunta and HMAS Stuart.

Van Heemskerk sailed on Convoy E, which left Townsville on 21 October and went to Fall River, and Convoy K, which left Townsville on 22 November and went to Port Moresby. On 26 and 27 December, while she was at Merauke, New Guinea, a Japanese float plane bombed her, causing seven casualties.

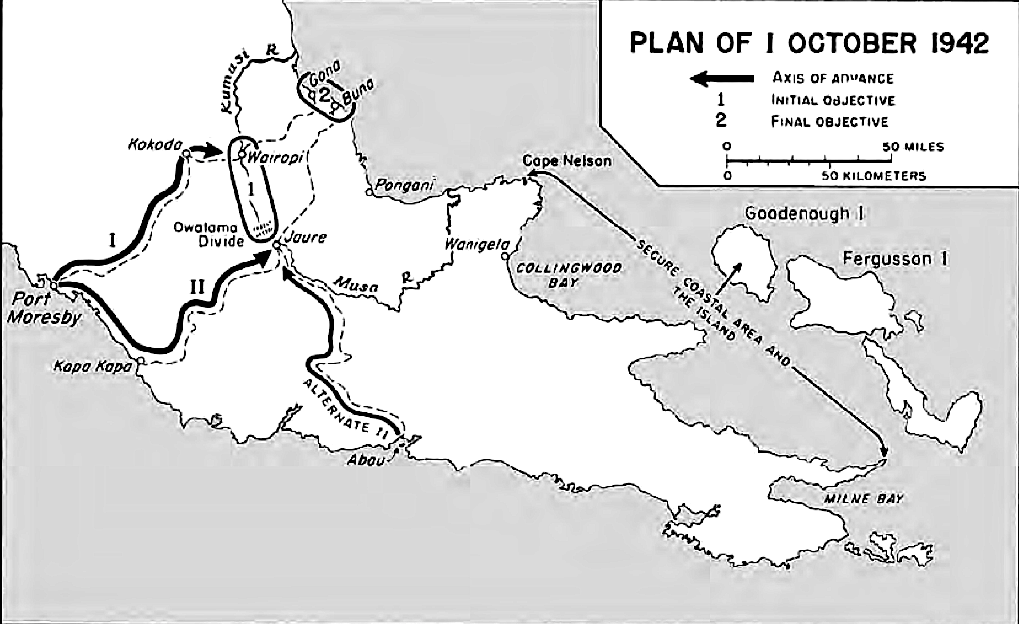
The area of Operation Lilliput

Logistical support of Allied operations on the north coast of New Guinea by sea required establishment of a port west of Milne Bay at Oro Bay, and a route by which large ships could pass through the largely uncharted and hazardous waters between. Small vessels transporting supplies in the early stages and survey vessels found that route and convoys code named Operation Lilliput were put into place to run two large ships under escort of one or two corvettes to Oro Bay in what were termed "flights" and given numbers. Van Heemskerk took part in a simultaneous, specialized operation code named Accountant that took the United States Army 162nd Regiment, 41st Division, from Australia to the Buna-Gona operations area. She was then to join the regular Lilliput convoy system as flight number 28.

== Loss ==
Van Heemskerk Bontekoe, and the motor ship Balikpapan, escorted by the destroyer HMAS Vendetta, formed Convoy TN67, which left Townsville on 6 April 1943. Van Heemskerk and Balikpapan, escorted by HMAS Kapunda, reached Milne Bay on 14 April 1943 just as the twenty-fourth air raid on that port was developing, and after being diverted from Port Moresby due to air raids there. Van Heemskerk disembarked her troops, but had cargo of ammunition and fuel to be unloaded, and not enough time to clear the bay.

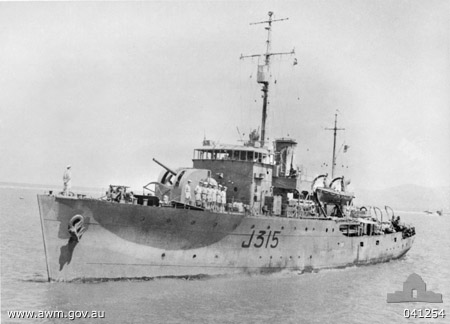
HMAS Wagga

The US troop commander left an improvised defense of 20 US soldiers. They put a Jeep with mounted .50 caliber machine gun on each cargo hatch for anti-aircraft cover. They survived four masthead-level attacks, but then a hit in a hold containing ammunition and fuel destroyed the Jeeps and their crews. HMAS Wagga and her crew tried to control the fire, until at about 17:00 hrs Van Heemskerk exploded. Four people were killed; the last casualties of Lilliput. Loss of Van Heemskerk caused the only cancellation of a Lilliput flight. 39 out of 40 were completed.
