= Operation Lilliput =

1942 Allied convoy operation near Papua New Guinea

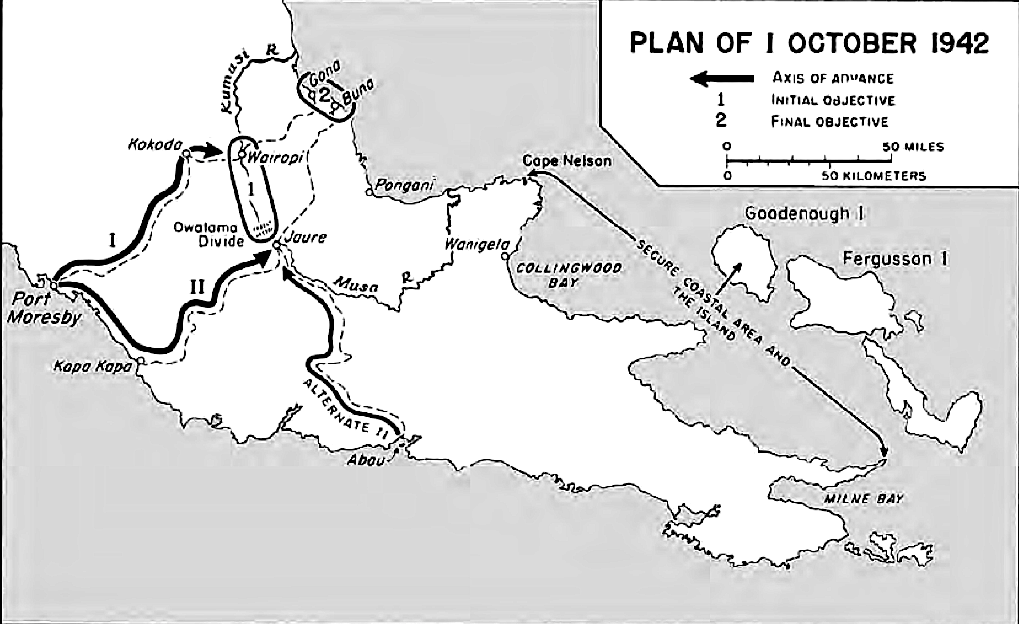
Lilliput area of operations.

Operation Lilliput was a convoy operation directed by G.H.Q. Operations Instructions Number 21 of 20 October 1942 for transportation of troops, weapons, and supplies in a regular transport service between Milne Bay and Oro Bay, New Guinea between 18 December 1942 and June 1943 in order "to cover reinforcement, supply, and development of the Buna-Gona area upon its anticipated capture" by the Australian 7th Division and the United States Army's 32d Division. Within six months, the convoys, escorted by Royal Australian Navy corvettes and largely composed of Dutch KPM merchant ships, had delivered 60,000 tons of supplies and 3,802 troops from Milne Bay to Oro Bay. Corvettes provided the majority of the escort force. Losses during Imperial Japanese air attacks amounted to two merchant ships, 's Jacob and Van Heemskerk, sunk and two badly damaged while several of the corvettes also sustained damage and casualties.

== Oro Bay ==
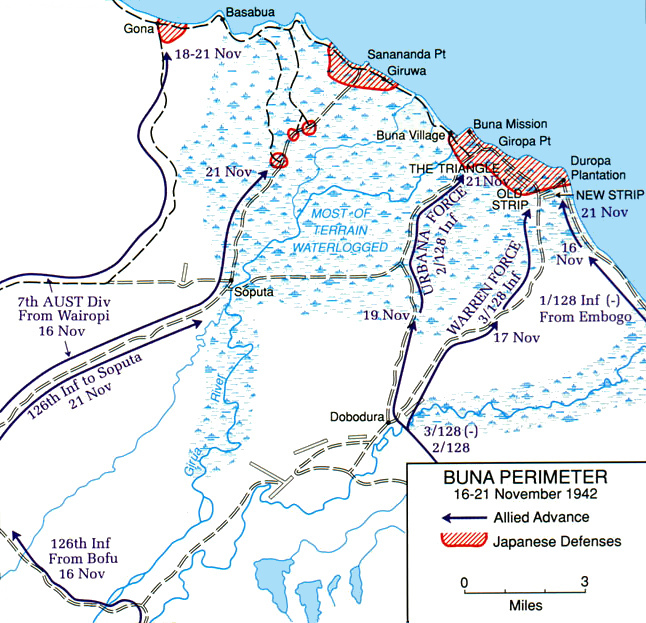
Buna-Gona local map showing Dobodura road terminus.

The western terminus of the convoys was Oro Bay some 211 miles (340 km) from Milne Bay and noted for its treacherous approaches between Milne Bay and Cape Nelson. The final approach was through a channel from .5 to .75 miles (0.80 to 1.21 km) wide and 36 to 48 feet (11.0 to 14.6 m) deep. The port area, with a capacity for six to eight ships in an anchorage of about 90 feet (27.4 m), some 15 miles (24 km) from Buna itself, had been used earlier by vessels of the Small Ships Section supporting the campaign.

On 14 December 1942, an advance party of the Lilliput Task Force arrived with landing barges in advance of the first U.S. Army controlled KPM vessels Karsik, Japara and Bantam between 20 and 24 December. Destroyers had been requested as convoy escorts by General Blamey, Commander, Allied Land Forces, but rejected by Vice Admiral Arthur S. Carpender commanding Allied Naval Forces noting the entire area between Cape Nelson and Buna was so filled with reefs that destroyers would be limited in maneuver and not effective against Japanese forces with clear sea room from bases in Rabaul. Further, requirements preliminary to the Guadalcanal operation required fleet units be on standby south of New Guinea. Thus the convoys would only have small, shallow draft warships for escort. A part of the Buna-Gona general plan was development of a deep water port in Oro Bay with a road to be constructed to an airfield to be developed for logistics and as a bomber base at Dobodura.

Initial landing operations were carried out under cover of night and construction of the 72 miles (116 km) of road between the port and Dobodura Airfield was begun by Australian units later augmented by U.S. Army units and equipment with completion within months. In the meantime, jeeps were used over jungle trails to deliver supplies. Over 50 air raids were experienced in the first six months and construction of wharves were started in mid 1943 as Operation Lilliput itself was coming to a close, and eight docks, some capable of supporting larger ships, were available by the first of August. After the Lilliput convoys ended, the port was developed into a major facility with machine shops, additional large ship dockage, a slipway of logs capable of handling small vessels and by August 1944 a 1,500-foot (457 m) wooden pier capable of supporting four Liberty ships at once.

== Convoy operations ==
Operation Lilliput was not an isolated operation as in a single landing or convoy series. It grew from very limited and difficult sea transport in support of the Buna campaign, the very serious lack of supplies for that campaign and had a parallel operation, using some of the same ships over essentially the same route. Convoys of similar nature continued after the formal Operation Lilliput stages had officially ended.

=== Small Ships Section ===
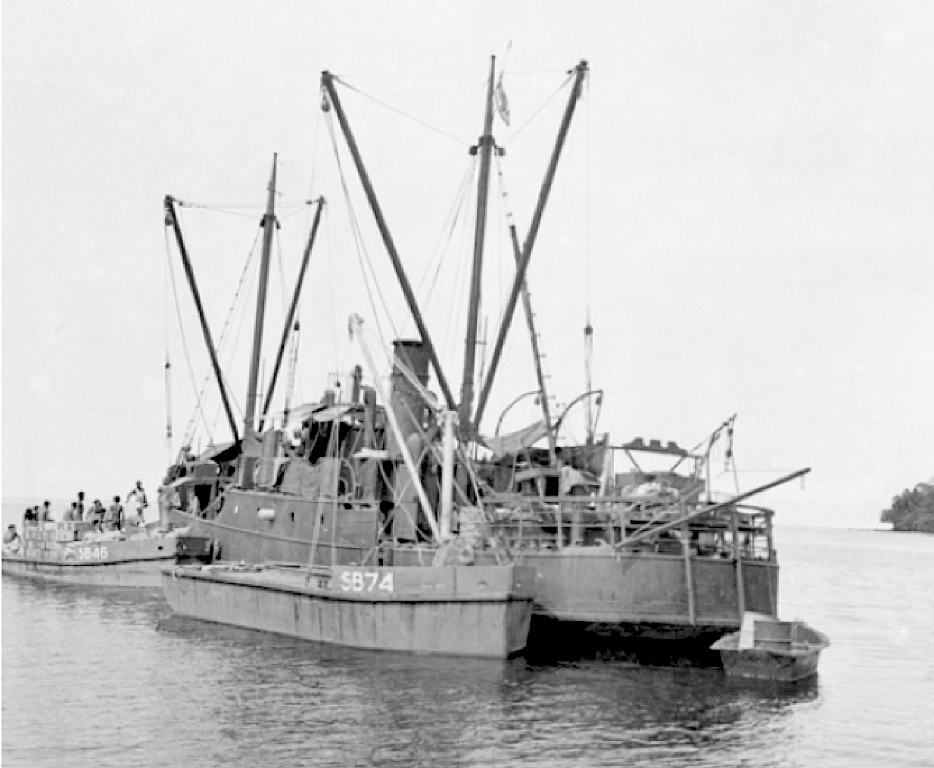
Hokitika (S-130), Small Ships Section, United States Army Services of Supply, Southwest Pacific Area (USASOSSWPA), unloading onto barges SB46 and SB74, January 1943, Oro Bay Area.

Prior to Lilliput convoy operations, the route had been used, and explored, by the Small Ships Section vessels providing both initial invasion and post invasion logistics support. The route had never been accurately charted and was described by Colonel, later Brigadier General, Thomas B. Wilson, Chief of Transportation, as "the most dangerous coastline in the world" with the pre-war route for Australian vessels avoiding the route in favor of one by way of Rabaul and the Solomon Sea into the north coast of New Guinea. Some 250 Small Ships vessels had been ordered into Milne Bay in October 1942 for support of the Buna area that had previously only been reached by air. These vessels, described as "schooners, motorships, motor launches, cabin cruisers, ketches, trawlers, barges, and miscellaneous vessels, most of which were ancient and rusty. Their Australian crews rigged sails when the engines broke down, and made emergency repairs when the hulls were punctured with bullets or jagged coral" had landed elements of the invasion force and provided logistical support—and "moved at night through uncharted waters, marking reefs with empty oil drums and keeping records of observations and soundings, which were later used in charts" after hiding in rivers by day.

=== Finding a way ===
The initial luggers and small ships "surveying" the route as they carried supplies were later augmented by HMAS Paluma, the 45 ton former examination vessel at Thursday Island, (Note: Requisitioned September 1941 and purchased 1 June 1942. The vessel had been intended to land intelligence gathering teams at Rabaul.) that began actual surveys to find a reliable approach for larger vessels from Milne Bay to supply troops landed by air near Cape Nelson. In addition to surveys, the vessel was to install lights, land shore parties for reconnaissance, establish radio stations and pilot ships through discovered channels. By the time troops had been airlifted in and secured the area on 5–6 October Paluma had completed survey of a route and supplies began to arrive by water. By early November, Paluma had found a route for large ships around Cape Nelson whereupon the larger vessels discharged at Porlock with the luggers concentrating on transport forward from there. The hydrographic section in the RAN learned of the local effort and lent assistance with surveys by HMAS Warrego, Stella and Polaris assisting, establishing safe passage for large ships from Milne Bay to Cape Nelson while Paluma worked the route forward to Oro Bay by December making the arrival of tanks possible starting on 11 December 1942 aboard Karsik.

=== Lilliput ===
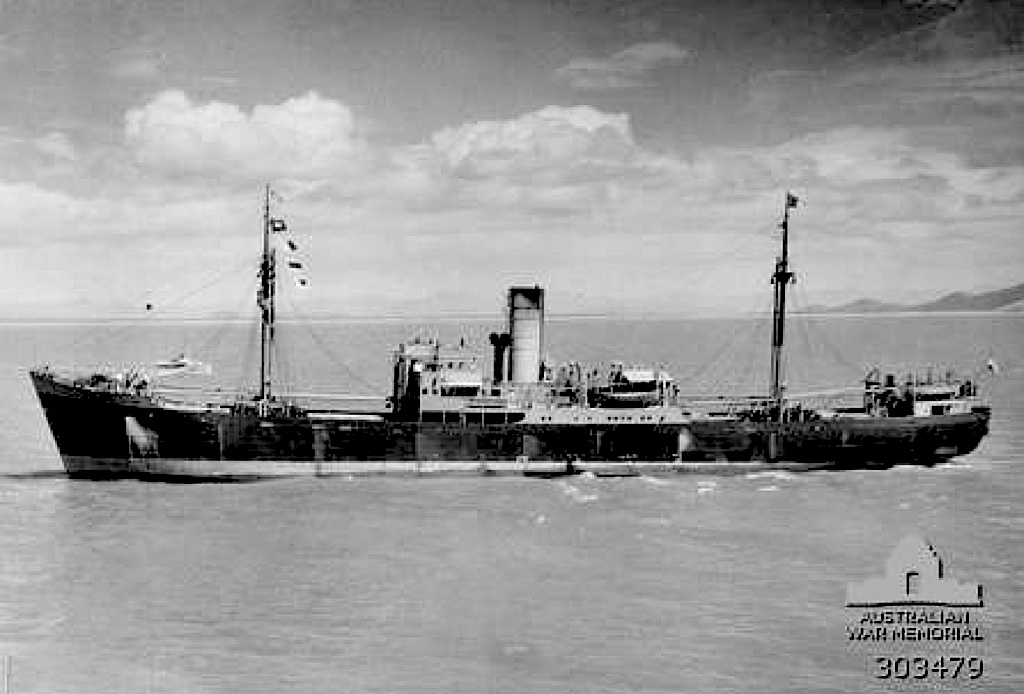
SS Karsik, ex German Soneck impounded in the Netherlands East Indies, was used as a train ferry at Batavia making her suited for transporting tanks to the Allied forces at Buna.

The urgent need for buildup of logistical support and supplies for the campaign and a base for future operations forced risking larger ships in these hazardous waters. In discussions during the first days of November 1942, New Guinea Force Headquarters decided that cargo vessels would be combat loaded in Australia, proceed to Port Moresby, then Milne Bay and then sent in small "flights" with an escort and one or two cargo vessels for the dangerous run to Oro Bay. On 15 November, the first large group left Townsville for Port Moresby with nine vessels escorted by the destroyer HMAS Arunta and corvettes HMAS Ballarat and Katoomba. Five cargo vessels and Arunta went into Port Moresby with the cargo vessels, Japara, Balikpapan, Bantam and J. B. Ashe escorted by the corvettes going on to Milne Bay for the first run to Buna, but delays in the Buna campaign forced holding of the ships into December with the Port Moresby ships unloading troops and cargo there and returning to Australia.

The first large vessel to arrive at Oro Bay was Karsik, escorted by HMAS Lithgow, on the night of 11–12 December 1942 with four Stuart light tanks (Note: Mayo notes: "These tanks, and those following a few days later, had little effect on the battle for Buna; the light, fast Stuarts, slowed by swamp mud choked with kunai grass, were, in the words of the Australian historian of the battle, "like race horses harnessed to heavy ploughs"; moreover, they were "almost blind because tank vision, restricted at the best of times, was shut off by the tropical growth." The fact a large ship had arrived and thus the opening of this supply line is attributed as the real difference made at this point.) that were loaded into recently arrived barges and then towed up the coast and landed within miles of the battlefront. Karsik then returned on the 14th with a second load of tanks for the forces at Buna. Karsik's first trip with tanks to Oro Bay was named "Operation Karsik" and the second as "Operation Tramsik" and immediately preceded the Lilliput convoys. On 18 December, Japara, under escort of Lithgow, departed in the inauguration of the regular Milne Bay to Oro Bay route, arriving on the 20th, that was with few exceptions run with the Dutch vessels. In the end, most of the KPM vessels of the local fleet had been engaged in the operation.

The operation concluded on 17 June 1943 with "Stage 40", when the U.S. Liberty ship Key Pittman returned to Milne Bay. After Lilliput's official conclusion on 5 July, six similar convoys were run.

Concurrent with Lilliput was Operation Accountant, the transport of elements of the 162nd Regiment of the United States 41st Division to Buna-Gona, that involved some of the same ships and escorts. Those were the escorts Ballarat, Bendigo, Echuca and Kapunda and the transports Bontekoe, Karsik and Van Heemskerk.

=== Vessels ===
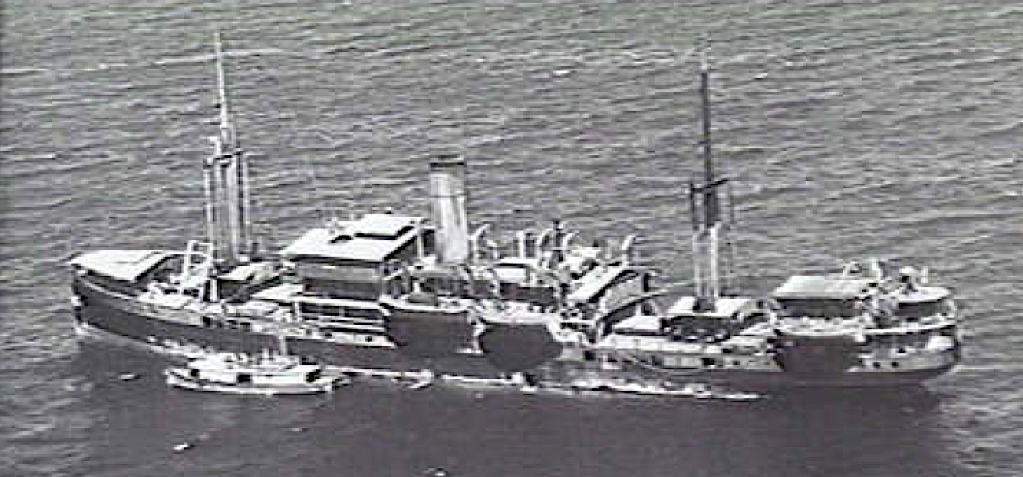
Dutch KPM cargo vessel SS Reijnst, which took part in Operation Lilliput in New Guinea between December 1942 and June 1943.

The Dutch vessels had been acquired through the Netherlands Government in London. Final negotiations between the War Shipping Administration (WSA) and the Dutch government resulted in their being placed under U.S. Army control through a complex charter arrangement in which the British Ministry War Transport (BMWT) chartered the KPM vessels, manned by Dutch officers and Indonesian crew, and jointly with WSA allocated them to the Southwest Pacific Area command's U.S. Army Services of Supply (USASOS) with the stipulation they be under total control of the U.S. Army.

In a footnote, Gill lists the Lilliput vessels as below with the U.S. Army assigned "X" numbers (Note: Changed to "Y" late in the war with the numeral retained. The numbers were largely for administrative use and did not appear to be affixed to the ship as with hull numbers.) in parentheses added from Masterson's Appendix 30.

The ships which took part in LILLIPUT were: RAN corvettes—Ballarat, Bendigo, Bowen, Broome, Bunbury, Colac, Echuca, Glenelg, Gympie, Kapunda, Katoomba, Latrobe, Lithgow, Pirie, Wagga; American submarine chasers SC-746 and SC-750; merchant ships—Anhui (X-6), Balikpapan (X-28), Bantam, Bontekoe (X-13), Both (X-15), Hanyang (X-8), Janssens (X-24), Japara (X-18), Karsik (X-20), Key Pittman, Lorinna, Maatsuyker (X-12), Patras (X-52), Reijnst (X-48), 's Jacob, Swartenhondt (X-14), Tasman (X-16), Thedens, Van den Bosch (X-23), Van Heutsz (X-11), Van Outhoorn (X-54), Van Spilbergen (X-29), Van Swoll (X-50), Yochow (X-7).

==== Ship losses ====
's Jacob and her escort Bendigo bound for Oro Bay had just passed Karsik and Kapunda off Porlock Harbour on their return to Milne Bay on 8 March when at one in the afternoon nine Japanese bombers escorted by 12 fighters attacked 's Jacob. She caught fire and sunk 16 minutes later. Five died and 153 survivors were picked up by Bendigo with two of those dying of injuries. Another flight attacked Karsik without success.

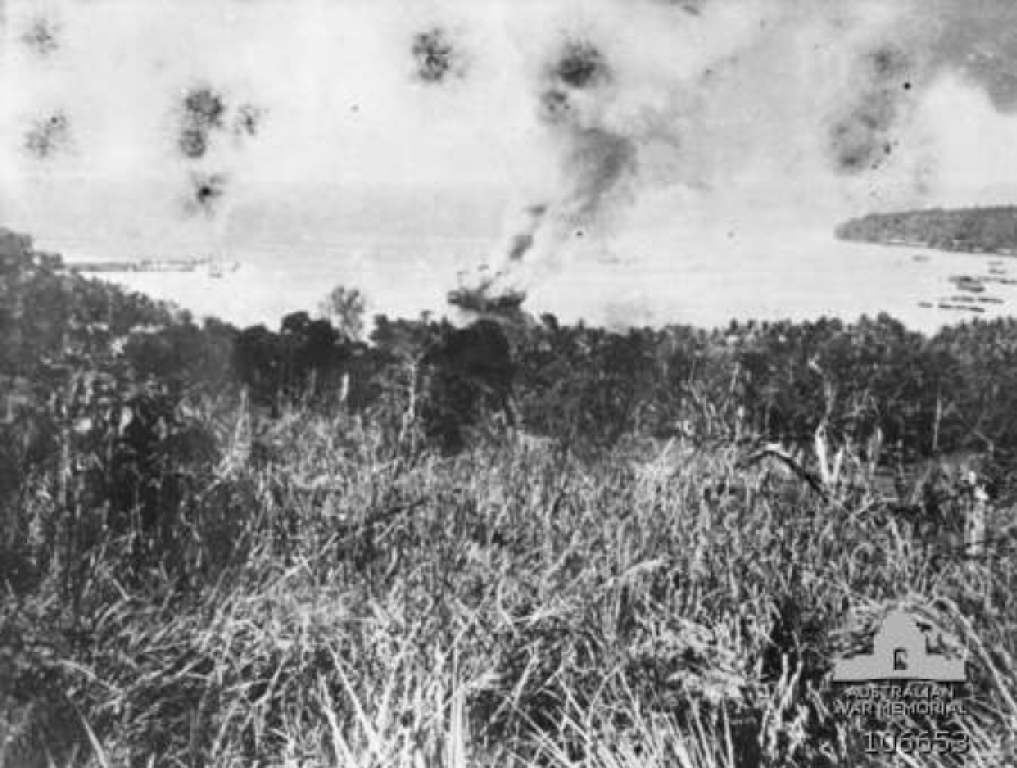
Bantam under Japanese air attack on 28 March 1943.

Bantam was unloading at the Oro Bay wharf on 28 March when 18 bombers and 40 fighters struck the port. Her escort, Bowen, was on antisubmarine patrol. Bantam was hit three times and was beached in a badly damaged state and later declared a loss. In the same raid the U.S. Army bareboat chartered ship Masaya, an ex-World War I destroyer and banana boat converted as a fast transport, was hit and sunk 5 miles (8.0 km; 4.3 nmi) to the east.

Van Heemskerk is not listed above, but was also part of the original 21 KPM ships joining the SWPA fleet and sunk 14 April 1943. The loss of Van Heemskerk in Milne Bay is noted as the cause for cancellation of one Lilliput convoy. The ship, Stage 28 of Operation Lilliput, was caught in a raid of 30 high altitude bombers, 10 dive bombers and an undetermined number of fighters just after her arrival in the bay and hit by dive bombers to become the last casualty of the operation. Despite efforts of the escort Wagga, fires could not be controlled and the ship blew up.

=== Summary ===
In the early stages, from December 1942 through February 1943, 12 Dutch ships and eight escorts delivered 40,000 tons of supplies and 2,400 troops in 18 individual voyages. Over the total period into mid-June 1943 with 15 corvettes, two American sub chasers and 24 cargo ships involved, the total became 39 voyages (One cancelled when Van Heemskerk was sunk at Milne Bay) transporting 60,000 tons of supplies and 3,802 troops.

Several escorts were damaged and suffered personnel casualties. Three of the ships, all KPM vessels, were lost. Others were damaged in air attacks. The original twenty-one KPM ships that formed the core of the early permanent local fleet of the Southwest Pacific Area's marine logistics had paid a price of one seventh of the original ships. (Note: The twenty-one original vessels were: Balikpapan (1938), Bantam (1939), Bontekoe (1922), Both (1931), Cremer (1926), Generaal Verspijck (1928), Janssens (1935), Japara (1930), Karsik (1938), Khoen Hoea (1924) (Ship was built for Thong Ek Steamship Co. specifically designed for the Singapore/Pontianak (Borneo) trade and chartered to KPM sometime in 1940. Evacuated part of ABDA naval staff from Java to Australia. (Gill, 1957, p. 627)) Maetsuycker (1936), 's Jacob (1907), Sibigo (1926), Stagen (1919), Swartenhondt (1924), Tasman (1921), Van den Bosch (1903), Van der Lijn (1928), Van Heemskerk (1909), Van Heutsz (1926) and Van Spilbergen (1908) (Masterson, page 322). There were numerous other KPM ships not originally or ever part of the SWPA permanent local fleet.)
