= HMAS Paluma (1941) =

Australian survey vessel

History

Australia
- Name: Paluma
- Builder: Mat Taylor, Townsville
- Fate: Burnt to waterline in 1990s

History

Australia
- Name: HMAS Paluma
- Acquired: 1941
- Commissioned: 1941
- Honours and awards: Battle honours: New Guinea 1942–43
- Fate: Returned to owner

General characteristics
- Tonnage: 45 Gross Tons
- Length: 66 ft (20 m)
- Beam: 14 ft (4.3 m)
- Draught: 5 ft 6 in (1.68 m)
- Speed: 11 knots (20 km/h; 13 mph)
- Armament: 2 × 0.5" Browning Machine Guns; 2 × .303" Bren Guns; 2 × Mk. VII depth charges

HMAS Paluma was a survey vessel that was operated by the Royal Australian Navy during World War II.

== Construction ==
The launch Paluma was built by Taylor's Slipway at Townsville, Australia, in 1941.

== Service history ==
Paluma was requisitioned for wartime use on 11 September 1941 and purchased on 1 June 1942. The launch was being used as the examination and patrol vessel at Thursday Island when offered to meet a requirement for seaworthy small ships to insert Coastwatchers and gather intelligence for a proposed Allied offensive against Rabaul. The Japanese move from Rabaul on New Guinea forestalled any Allied attack on Rabaul and shifted focus to a counter offensive in New Guinea.

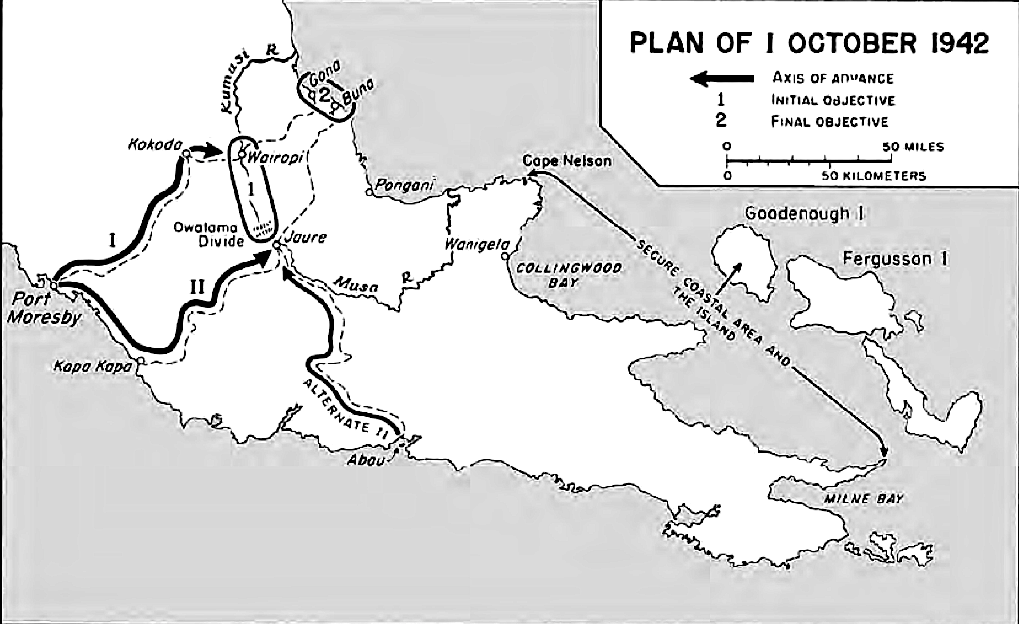
Inshore sea route area of operations.

The prewar sea route to the north coast of New Guinea, particularly the Buna area of planned operations, had been closed by the Japanese advance and naval control of open waters leaving only an inshore route described by MacArthur's Chief of Transportation, as "the most dangerous coastline in the world" and essentially uncharted. In October 1942, all the vessels of the US Army Small Ships Section, largely crewed by Australians, had been ordered to Milne Bay to support the operations against Japanese in the Buna area. Those small vessels, in their night runs to Oro Bay, had begun noting channels and marking reefs with oil drums. The small ships could not support the beachhead, being largely supported by air, with heavy equipment and supplies so that a way for large ships had to be found.

Paluma, under the command of Lieutenant Ivan Champion RANVR, was assigned to survey a reliable, large vessel, route from Milne Bay to Oro Bay. In addition to surveys, the vessel was to install lights, land shore parties under Captain J . K. McCarthy for reconnaissance, establish radio stations and pilot ships through discovered channels. By early November Paluma had found a route around Cape Nelson when the hydrographic section in the RAN learned of the local effort and lent assistance with surveys by HMAS Warrego, Stella and Polaris assisting, establishing safe passage for large ships from Milne Bay to Cape Nelson while Paluma worked the route forward to Oro Bay so that by 11 December 1942 the US Army controlled Dutch vessel Karsik was able to deliver tanks to the front. Immediately after Karsik's passage the regular convoys code named Operation Lilliput began operations.

Paluma was awarded the battle honour "New Guinea 1942–43".

== Fate ==
After service she was returned to her owners in Townsville. It was used for scheduled trips to Palm Island, and irregular charters. It sat idle in Ross Creek during the 1980s, next to the Flinders Street ferry terminal. The vessel was refitted in 1990 to be used for charters, although it did not pass survey. Paluma burnt to the waterline near Airlie Beach in the 1990s.

== Bibliography ==
- Gill, G. Hermon (1968). Royal Australian Navy 1939–1942. Australia in the War of 1939–1945. Series 2 – Navy. Vol. 2. Canberra: Australian War Memorial. LCCN 76454854.
- Dunn, Peter (14 January 2015). "Magnetic Island Boat Paluma Was Once A Support Vessel for the Coastwatchers During WW2".
- Ind, Allison (1958). Allied Intelligence Bureau. New York: McKay Co. LCCN 58012259.
- Masterson, Dr. James R. (1949). U. S. Army Transportation in the Southwest Pacific Area 1941–1947. Washington, D. C.: Transportation Unit, Historical Division, Special Staff, U. S. Army.
- Milner, Samuel (1957). Victory in Papua. United States Army in World War II. Washington, DC: Center of Military History, United States Army. LCCN 56060004.
- "Navy Marks 109th Birthday With Historic Changes To Battle Honours". Royal Australian Navy. 1 March 2010. Archived from the original on 13 June 2011.
- "Royal Australian Navy Ship/Unit Battle Honours" (PDF). Royal Australian Navy. 1 March 2010. Archived from the original (PDF) on 14 June 2011.
- "The Townsville Daily Bulletin, Tuesday April 8, 1941". Townsville Daily Bulletin. QLD. 8 April 1941. p. 4.
