= SS 's Jacob =

Dutch passenger steamship that was built in 1907 and sunk in 1943

Coordinates: 09°01′S 149°01′E

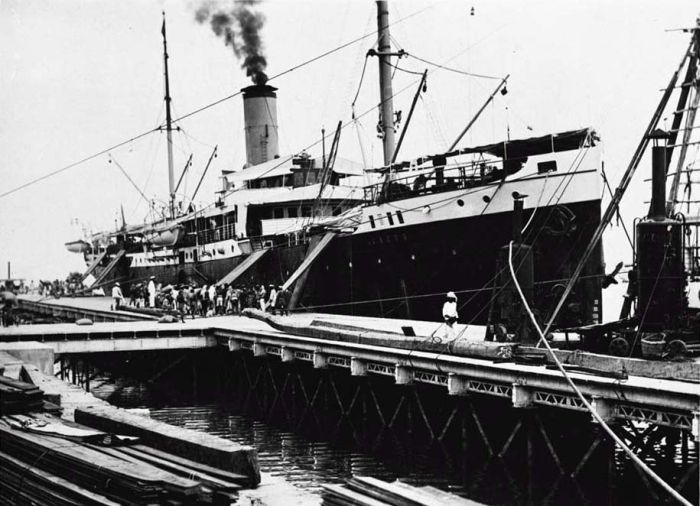
- 's Jacob in port in Makassar, about 1907–14

History
- Name: 's Jacob
- Namesake: Frederik Bernard 's Jacob
- Owner: 1907: Koninklijke Paketvaart-Mij; 1918: Shipping Controller; 1919: Koninklijke Paketvaart-Mij
- Operator: 1918: British India SN Co
- Port of registry: 1907: (Netherlands) Batavia; 1917: (United Kingdom); 1919: (Netherlands) Batavia
- Builder: Mij v S&W Fijenoord, Rotterdam
- Yard number: 211
- Laid down: 26 February 1907
- Launched: 25 July 1907
- Completed: October 1907
- Identification: code letters TFGK (until 1925); code letters TFPN (1925–33); call sign PKRV (1934 onward)
- Fate: Sunk, 8 March 1943

General characteristics
- Type: passenger ship
- Tonnage: 2,907 GRT, 1,853 NRT, 3,438 DWT
- Length: 325.5 ft (99.2 m)
- Beam: 44.1 ft (13.4 m)
- Depth: 22.8 ft (6.9 m)
- Decks: 2
- Installed power: 233 NHP, 1,300 ihp
- Propulsion: 1 × screw; 1 × triple-expansion engine
- Speed: 10 knots (19 km/h)
- Capacity: passengers: as built: 8 × 1st class, 18 × 2nd class, 1,000 × steerage; 1928: 8 × 1st class, 26 × 2nd class, 1,420 × deck; cargo: 180,000 cubic feet (5,100 m^{3}) grain, 144,000 cubic feet (4,100 m^{3}) bale
- Armament: 1941: 1 × 4 in (100 mm) gun
- Notes: one of several sister ships

SS 's Jacob (Note: The ship's name, and namesake's name, are commonly given as s' Jacob in modern online sources and some printed publications. However, Australian and US official histories spell it 's Jacob. Lloyd's Register spelt it 'sJacob, without spacing. This is apparently an old Dutch form for proper names, perhaps for "das" (of) contracted into simply 's.) was a passenger steamship that was launched in the Netherlands in 1907 and sunk by enemy action off New Guinea in 1943. She spent most of her career with Koninklijke Paketvaart-Maatschappij (KPM, the "Royal Packet Navigation Company"), based in the Dutch East Indies.

In the First World War the United Kingdom seized her under angary. In the Second World War she escaped the Japanese invasion of the Dutch East Indies, and became part of the Southwest Pacific Area (SWPA) command's permanent local fleet. A Japanese air attack sank her on 8 March 1943.

== Building ==
Between 1907 and 1914, KPM took delivery of a set of sister ships from different Dutch shipyards. Maatschappij voor Scheeps- en Werktuigbouw Fijenoord in Rotterdam completed 's Jacob in 1907, Le Maire and Van Spilbergen in 1908, Van der Hagen in 1909, Van Waerwijck in 1910, and Sloet van de Beele and Van Imhoff in 1914. Nederlandsche Scheepsbouw Maatschappij in Amsterdam completed Van Heemskerk in 1909, Van Linschoten in 1910, and Van Neck in 1912. Rijkee & Co in Rotterdam completed Van Rees in 1913.

Fijenoord built the first ship of the series as yard number 211. She was laid down on 26 February 1907 as Van Noort, but she was launched on 25 July as 's Jacob, after Frederik Bernard 's Jacob. She was completed that October. Her registered length was 325.5 ft (99.2 m), her beam was 44.1 ft (13.4 m) and her depth was 22.8 ft (6.9 m). Her tonnages were 2,907 GRT, 1,853 NRT, and 3,438 DWT. She had berths for 1,026 passengers: eight in first class, 18 in second class, and 1,000 in steerage. Her holds had capacity for 180,000 cubic feet (5,100 m^{3}) of grain, or 144,000 cubic feet (4,100 m^{3}) of baled cargo.

The ship had a single screw, driven by a three-cylinder triple-expansion steam engine. It was rated at 233 NHP or 1,300 ihp, and gave her a speed of 10 knots (19 km/h).

KPM registered 's Jacob at Batavia in the Dutch East Indies. Her code letters were TFGK.

== Career until 1940 ==
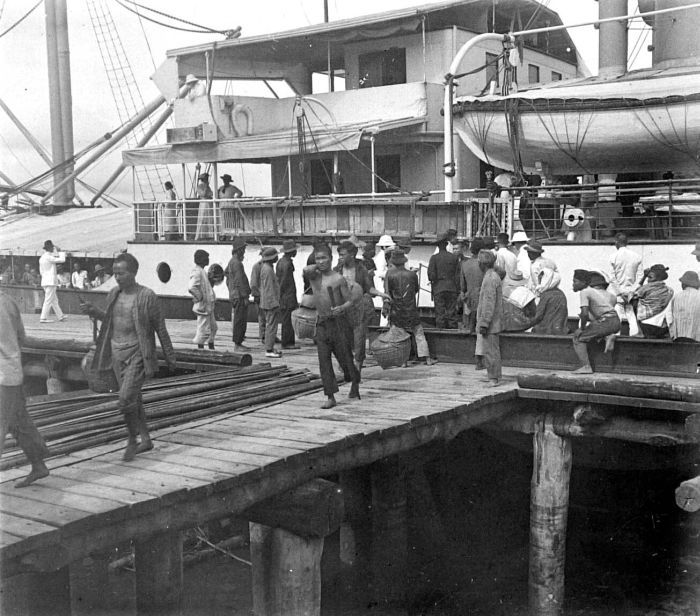
Chinese labourers froon Shantou disembarking from 's Jacob at Belawan to work on Sumatran tobacco plantations, about 1907–15

On 20 March 1918 President Woodrow Wilson issued Proclamation 1436, authorising the seizure under angary of Dutch ships in US ports. The UK also seized Dutch ships in ports of the British Isles and the British Empire. 's Jacob was seized in Singapore. She was vested in the UK Shipping Controller, who appointed the British India Steam Navigation Company to manage her. The ship was returned to her owners in February 1919.

In 1925 's Jacob's code letters were changed to TFPN. In 1928 her passenger accommodation was changed to eight first class, 26 second class, and 1,420 deck passengers. This changed her tonnages to 2,988 GRT and 1,873 NRT. In 1934 the call sign PKRV superseded her code letters. In 1935 her tonnages were reassessed as 2,839 GRT and 1,770 NRT.

== Second World War ==
In August 1940 the Royal Netherlands Navy requisitioned 's Jacob to be scuttled as a blockship in the Port of Tanjung Priok. However, on 17 February 1941 she was returned to her owners.

On 8 December 1941 Japan invaded the Dutch East Indies. On 1 March 1942 Japanese forces landed on Java. 's Jacob took part in logistics support for the American-British-Dutch-Australian Command (ABDA) effort to hold the Malay Barrier. With four tankers and a cargo ship, 's Jacob sailed in Convoy MS4, which left Sydney on 31 January bound for the ABDA theatre of operations, taking the route south of Australia and up the west coast. On 15 February, the day Singapore fell, and as HMAS Perth took over the escort, ports in Sumatra were falling and the tankers and other cargo ships were ordered to return to Fremantle. 's Jacob and Perth continued, and were later joined by the Dutch ships Swartenhondt and Karsik, but on the evening of 21 February, some 600 nautical miles (1,100 km) south of the Sunda Strait, they too were ordered to return to Fremantle.

's Jacob was one of the 21 KPM ships that were based in Australia after Java fell on 12 March. The Commanding General, United States Army Forces in Australia (USAFIA) was ordered to buy or charter the ships for the SWPA's permanent local fleet. On 26 March 1942, the Chief Quartermaster, USAFIA arranged interim charters pending final negotiations with the Dutch government-in-exile in London. Final negotiations between the US War Shipping Administration (WSA) and the Dutch government resulted in their being placed under United States Army control through a complex charter arrangement in which the UK Ministry of War Transport (MoWT) chartered the KPM vessels and with WSA allocated them to SWPA with the stipulation they be under total control of the US Army. They typically were crewed by KPM's Dutch officers and Javanese crew. 's Jacob was defensively armed with a 4-inch naval gun mounted aft.

The ship took part in the early days of reinforcements for Port Moresby and Milne Bay in New Guinea. She was in Convoy A3, which left Brisbane on 10 August 1942 and reached Fall River in Milne Bay on 17 August. On 2 September 1942, 's Jacob and Anshun left Townsville for Milne Bay in Convoy Q2, escorted by HMAS Swan and later HMAS Arunta. On 5 September, the convoy was holding south of China Strait as Japanese naval forces were expected in Milne Bay that night. Arunta escorted Anshun into the port the next day with Swan and 's Jacob awaiting orders south of the strait where Arunta joined them in the night. Meanwhile, Anshun was discharging cargo by lights when Japanese surface forces attacked the port, and the light cruiser Tenryū shelled and capsized her. 's Jacob entering Milne Bay was considered an unnecessary risk, and the escorts were ordered to Port Moresby until the situation stabilized.

's Jacob took part in three more convoys from Queensland to Milne Bay, each of which took three days. Convoy W left Cairns on 22 September 1942, and Convoy TN11 left Townsville on 1 December. Convoy TN 42 left Townsville on 26 February 1943, and reached Milne Bay on 1 March.

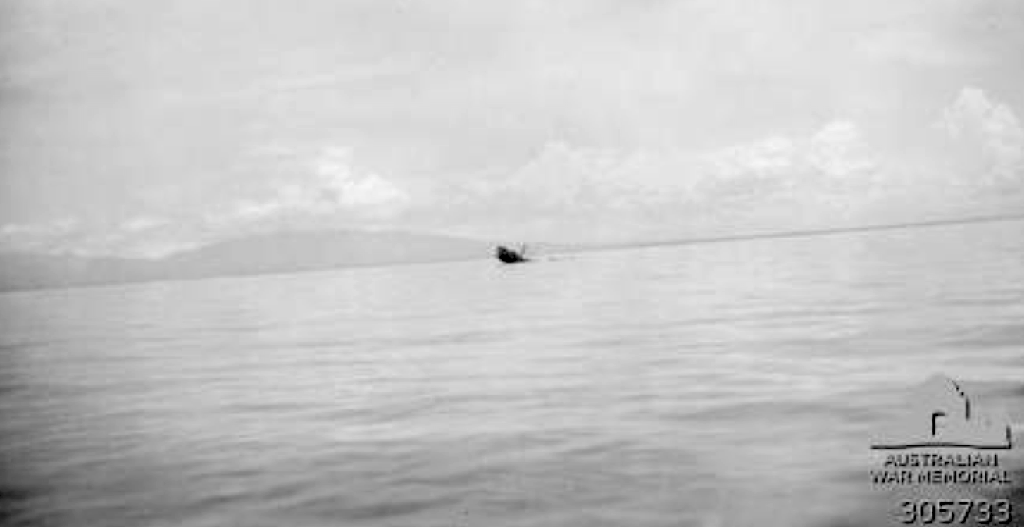
's Jacob sinking by the bow

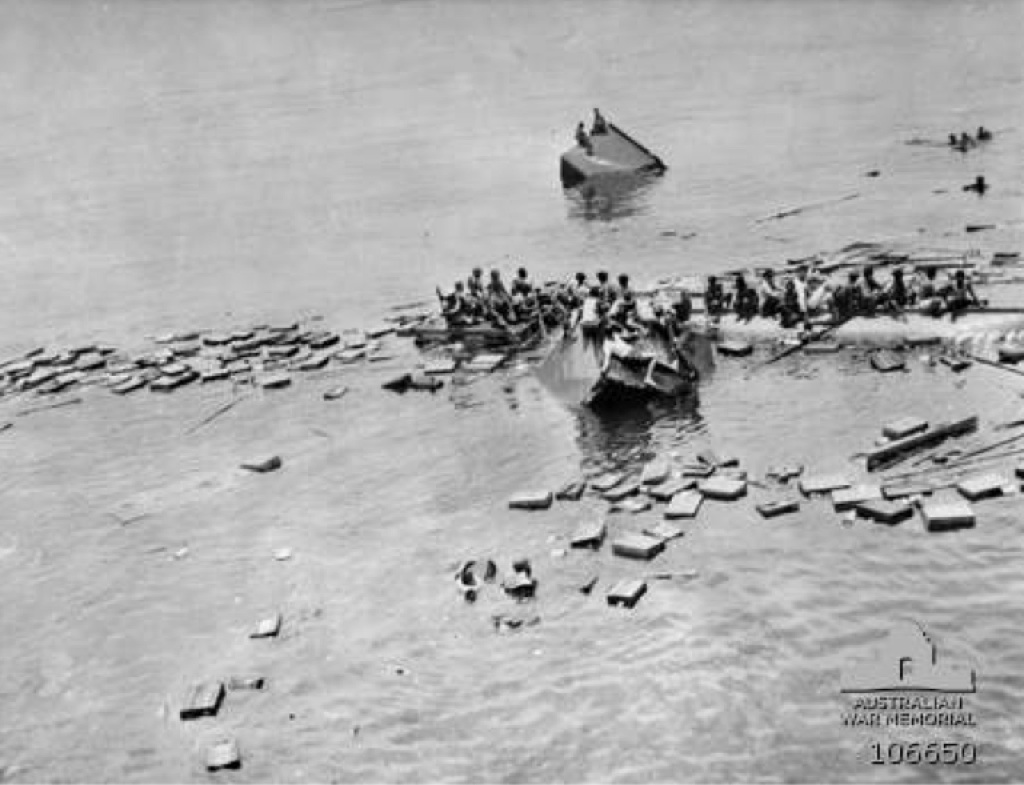
Survivors from 's Jacob about to be rescued by HMAS Bendigo (out of picture), 8 March 1943.

's Jacob then joined Operation Lilliput. Escorted by the Australian corvette HMAS Bendigo, she left Milne Bay carrying troops, weapons, and supplies bound for Oro Bay. On 8 March 1943, as 's Jacob rounded Cape Nelson, nine high-flying Japanese bombers escorted by 12 fighters attacked her near Porlock Bay. The aircraft scored three direct hits and at least 15 near misses, which caused serious structural damage and wounded several crewmen. A large fire started on the foreship, and her water pumps shut down, which prevented firefighting. The order was given to abandon ship. All those aboard jumped overboard and clung to wreckage. Bendigo rescued 158 men, two of whom died on the way to Milne Bay. Within 18 minutes of the attack, 's Jacob sank at 13:16 hrs off Porlock Harbor.

Five men were killed in the sinking, including Private George Watson, who remained in the water and instead of trying to save himself, helped into liferafts those soldiers who could not swim. He was posthumously awarded the Medal of Honor.

In 1986 divers found 's Jacob's wreck 9 nautical miles (17 km) off Porlock Harbour, at a depth of 160 feet (49 m). The ship's bell was recovered and later given to the Lae Yacht Club.
