= USS Leonis =

Cargo ship of the United States Navy

History

United States
- Name: Key Pittman
- Namesake: Key Pittman
- Owner: War Shipping Administration (WSA)
- Operator: Coastwise Lines
- Ordered: as a Type EC2-S-C1 hull, MCE hull 512
- Builder: Permanente Metals Corporation, Richmond, California
- Yard number: 512
- Way number: 1
- Laid down: 21 November 1942
- Launched: 22 December 1942
- In service: 31 December 1942
- Fate: transferred to the US Navy, 10 October 1943

United States
- Name: Leonis
- Namesake: The constellation Leo
- Acquired: 10 October 1943
- Commissioned: 25 October 1943
- Decommissioned: 5 December 1945
- Stricken: 15 December 1946
- Identification: Hull symbol: AK-128; Code letters: NHDZ
- Honors and awards: 2 × battle stars
- Fate: Sold for scrapping, 29 April 1966

General characteristics
- Class & type: Crater-class cargo ship
- Displacement: 4,023 long tons (4,088 t) (standard); 14,550 long tons (14,780 t) (full load)
- Length: 441 ft 6 in (134.57 m)
- Beam: 56 ft 11 in (17.35 m)
- Draft: 28 ft 4 in (8.64 m)
- Installed power: 2 × Combustion Engineering header-type boilers, 220psi 450°; 2,500 shp (1,900 kW)
- Propulsion: 1 × General Machine Corp. vertical triple-expansion reciprocating steam engine; 1 × shaft
- Speed: 12.5 kn (23.2 km/h; 14.4 mph)
- Capacity: 7,800 t (7,700 long tons) DWT; 444,206 cu ft (12,578.5 m^{3}) (non-refrigerated)
- Complement: 234
- Armament: 1 × 5 in (127 mm)/38 caliber dual purpose gun; 2 × 40 mm (1.6 in) Bofors anti-aircraft (AA) gun mounts; 6 × 20 mm (0.8 in) Oerlikon cannons AA mounts

USS Leonis (AK-128) was a Crater-class cargo ship in service with the US Navy in World War II. It was the only ship of the Navy to have borne this name, Latin for "of a lion", presumably referring to the northern constellation Leo.

== Construction ==
Leonis was laid down 21 November 1942, as liberty ship SS Key Pittman, MCE hull 512, by Permanente Metals Corporation, Yard No. 1, Richmond, California, under a Maritime Commission (MARCOM) contract and launched 22 December 1942.

== Merchant history ==
Key Pittman was initially under War Shipping Administration (WSA) control and was the first Liberty ship to make the transit from Milne Bay to Oro Bay with supplies for the New Guinea campaign arriving Oro Bay on 11 June 1943 and departing 16 June. The arrival of Key Pittman back in Milne Bay on 17 June signified the end of Operation Lilliput which had before that time largely involved Dutch ships.

== Service history ==
The ship was acquired by the Navy 6 October 1943; renamed Leonis 11 October, and commissioned 25 October 1943.

After shakedown along the west coast, Leonis departed San Pedro 6 December, with cargo for the Pacific islands. Arriving Pago Pago, American Samoa, on 22 December, she remained there until 1 January 1944, when she sailed for Funafuti Atoll, Ellice Islands. From January to April, Leonis shuttled cargo among the Marshall, Gilbert, and Ellice Islands before sailing for Pearl Harbor 19 April.

Assigned to the V Amphibious Corps, Leonis loaded troops at Pearl Harbor and departed the Hawaiian Islands 29 May. According to her status card, with MARAD, her "t'ween" deck, above the No. 3 hold, had extra living quarters, the starboard side had extra heads, washrooms, and laundry, and that amidship on her main deck she had extra hospital and mess rooms. The destination was the Marianas needed "to secure control of sea communications through the central Pacific for the support of further attacks on the Japanese." Leonis arrived in the transport area off Saipan with reinforcements and cargo 20 June, 5 days after the initial landings. Remaining off Saipan until 3 July, she made a brief stop at Eniwetok, then returned to Pearl Harbor on 27 July.

Following training and repairs, the cargo ship departed Pearl Harbor 20 August, to join the forces preparing for the Palau Islands campaign. After stopovers at Kwajalein and Manus, Leonis arrived Kossal Passage 20 September, with men and equipment needed to capture the islands. The Palaus were utilized as an advance base for the Leyte operations, and Leonis remained off Peleliu until mid-November.

After loading Marines and other passengers at Peleliu, the Russell Islands, Tulagi, and Guadalcanal, the cargo ship sailed for the United States, arriving San Francisco 18 December. Reloading with battle supplies, Leonis departed San Francisco 11 January 1945 to join the Western Pacific Forces as a fleet issue ship.

Touching the Marshalls and Carolinas en route, she arrived San Pedro Bay, Leyte Gulf, 28 February. For the rest of the war she remained primarily in the Philippines supplying the fleet with dry stores and medical provisions. Following the Japanese surrender, Leonis departed Leyte 4 September, arriving San Pedro, California, 1 month later.

== Inactivation and decommissioning ==
Sailing again 15 October, the veteran cargo ship proceeded toward the East Coast, arriving Norfolk, Virginia 6 November. Leonis decommissioned there 5 December 1945 and was returned to WSA the 9 December. Her name also reverted to Key Pittman.

The ship was subsequently laid up in the National Defense Reserve Fleet, James River Group, Lee Hall, Virginia. Key Pittman was sold on 29 April 1966, to Universal Salvage Corporation, but she was returned in August because of default in payment. She was again sold on 2 November 1967, for scrapping, to North American Smelting Company. She was delivered 21 November 1967, with scrapping completed 17 November 1968.

== Awards ==
Leonis received two battle stars for World War II service.

== Notes ==
Citations

== Bibliography ==
Online resources

- "Leonis". Dictionary of American Naval Fighting Ships. Naval History and Heritage Command. 29 July 2015. This article incorporates text from this source, which is in the public domain.
- "Kaiser Permanente No. 1, Richmond CA". www.ShipbuildingHistory.com. 13 October 2010.
- "USS Leonis (AK-128)". NavSource. 11 July 2014.
- "KEY PITTMAN". United States Department of Transportation. Archived from the original on December 12, 2019.

Books

- Masterson, Dr. James R. (1949). U. S. Army Transportation In The Southwest Pacific Area 1941-1947. Washington, D. C.: Transportation Unit, Historical Division, Special Staff, U. S. Army. p. 589.
- Gill, G. Hermon (1968). Royal Australian Navy 1939–1942. Australia in the War of 1939–1945. Series 2 – Navy. Vol. 2. Canberra: Australian War Memorial. Archived from the original on 27 September 2013.
