= HMAS Arunta (I30) =

Tribal-class destroyer of the Royal Australian Navy

Coordinates: 33°50′S 151°19′E

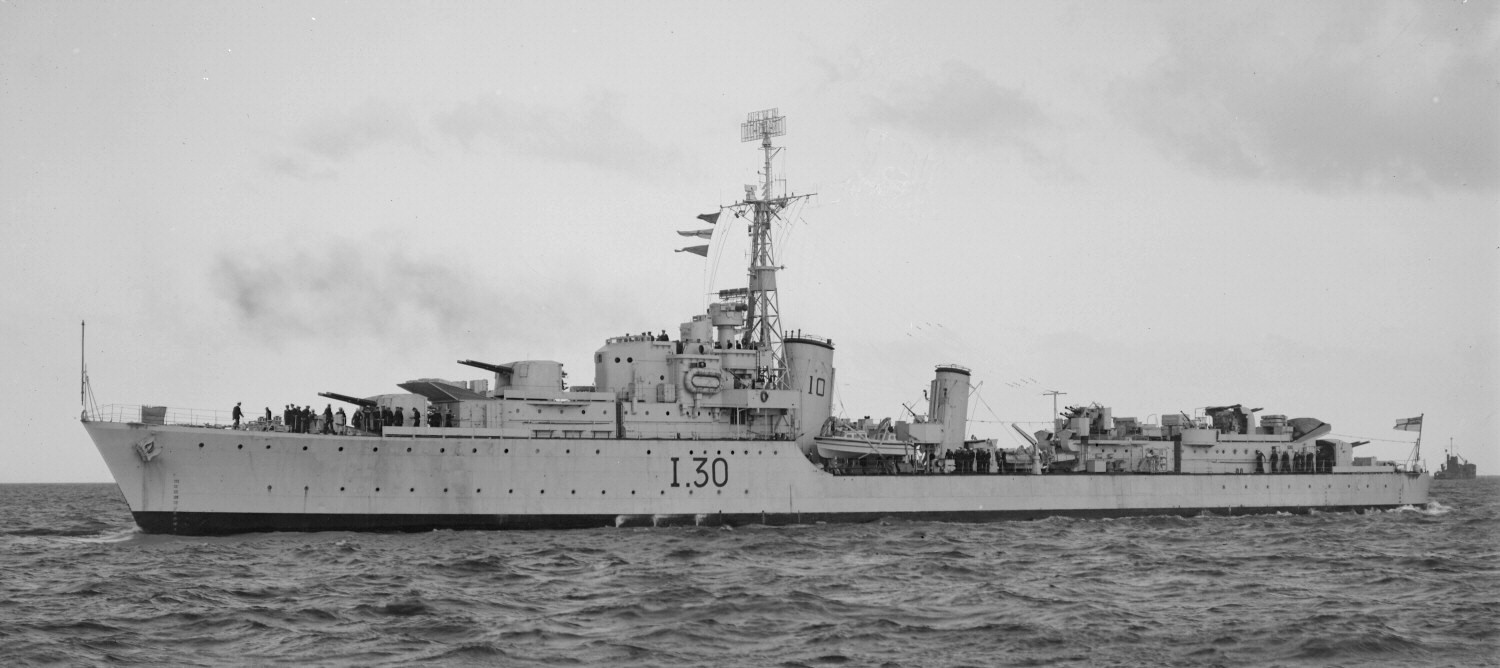
- HMAS Arunta during World War II

History

Australia
- Namesake: The Arrernte people
- Builder: Cockatoo Docks and Engineering Company
- Laid down: 15 November 1939
- Launched: 30 November/1 December 1940
- Commissioned: 30 March 1942
- Decommissioned: 21 December 1956
- Motto: "Conquer or Die"
- Honours and awards: Battle honours; Pacific 1942–45; New Guinea 1942–44; Leyte Gulf 1944; Lingayen Gulf 1945; Borneo 1945
- Fate: Sold for scrap in 1968, sank while under tow in 1969
- Badge

General characteristics
- Class & type: Tribal-class destroyer
- Displacement: 1,990 tons (at launch); 2,122 tons (1945 refit)
- Length: 377 ft 1 in (114.94 m) overall; 355 ft 6 in (108.36 m) between perpendiculars
- Beam: 36 ft 4.75 in (11.0935 m)
- Draught: 9 ft (2.7 m)
- Propulsion: Parsons geared turbines, twin screws. 44,000 horsepower
- Speed: 36.5 knots (67.6 km/h; 42.0 mph)
- Complement: 12 officers, 178 sailors (initial); 13 officers, 247 sailors (later)
- Sensors & processing systems: Radar: SG1; SG4; 285P4; 253P
- Armament: At launch: 6 × QF 4.7-inch (120-mm) Mk XII guns (3 twin turrets); 2 × QF 4-inch (101.6 mm) Mk XVI anti-aircraft guns (1 twin turret); 6 × 20-millimetre (0.79 in) Oerlikon anti-aircraft guns; 1 × 2-pounder (40-mm) quadruple pom pom; 1 × 4-tube 21-inch (530 mm) torpedo launcher (4 torpedoes); 2 × depth charge throwers (46 charges); 1945 refit: All Oerlikons removed; 6 × 40-millimetre (1.6 in) Bofors anti-aircraft guns installed; 1949 modernisation: 2 × 4.7-in guns (1 turret) removed; All depth charge throwers removed; Quadruple pom pom removed; 2 × 40 mm Bofors (1 twin mounting) installed; 1 × Squid anti-submarine mortar installed
- Notes: Taken from:

HMAS Arunta (I30/D5/D130) was a Tribal-class destroyer of the Royal Australian Navy (RAN). Named for the Arrernte Aboriginal peoples, the destroyer was laid down in 1939 and commissioned into the RAN in 1942.

Arunta fought during the second half of World War II; initially as a convoy escort and patrol ship, then in the shore bombardment and amphibious landing support roles while attached to the United States 7th Fleet. During the war, she was responsible for sinking Japanese submarine Ro-33 off Port Moresby on 24 August 1942, and earned five battle honours (one of which was later rescinded). After the war's end, Arunta underwent two deployments to Japan as part of the British Commonwealth Occupation Force.

The ship underwent a lengthy modernisation from 1949 to 1952, and was reclassified as an anti-submarine destroyer. After conversion, Arunta served in Korean waters after the Korean War armistice, and was one of the first Australian warships assigned to the Far East Strategic Reserve.

Arunta was paid off into operational reserve at the end of 1956, where she remained for twelve years. In 1968, the destroyer was sold for scrap, but was never broken up, instead sinking while under tow off Broken Bay on 13 February 1969.

== Description ==
At launch, the destroyer was fitted with six 4.7-inch (120 mm) guns in three twin turrets, two 4-inch (100 mm) guns in a twin turret, six single 20-millimetre (0.79 in) Oerlikon anti-aircraft guns, a 2-pounder quadruple pom pom, a 4-tube 21-inch (530 mm) torpedo launcher (with a payload of four torpedoes), and two depth charge throwers (with a magazine of 46 charges). Arunta's radar suite consisted of an SG1, an SG4, a 285P4, and a 253P.

In September 1945, all six Oerlikons were replaced with single 40-millimetre (1.6 in) Bofors anti-aircraft guns.

During a modernisation starting in 1949, the aft 4.7-inch gun turret and the depth charge throwers were removed, with the freed-up deck space used to install a Squid anti-submarine mortar. The quadruple pom pom was exchanged for two 40 mm Bofors in a twin mounting. The radar suite was upgraded, requiring that the tripod radar mast be replaced with a stronger lattice structure.

== Construction and career ==
Arunta, named for the Arrernte Aborigines, was ordered by the Naval Board January 1939 and laid down by the Cockatoo Docks and Engineering Company Limited at the Cockatoo Island Dockyard, Sydney in New South Wales on 15 November 1939. She was the first of three Australian Tribal class destroyers.

The destroyer was launched on 30 November 1940 by Lady Zara Gowrie, wife of the serving Governor-General, but became stuck halfway down the slipway, requiring the launching ceremony to be completed the next day. Completed at a cost of AU£500,000, Arunta was commissioned into the RAN on 30 March 1942, exactly a month before work on the ship was completed.

=== World War II ===
Arunta commenced her operational career on 17 May 1942, by conducting anti-submarine patrols off New South Wales. Those included a specific search based on sightings and attack by gunfire on the Russian vessel Wellen on 16 May in which Arunta, USS Perkins and HNLMS Tromp searched without success for the submarine. On 18 May, in company with Tromp, Arunta escorted convoy "ZK.8" out of Sydney composed of the Dutch ships Bantam, (Note: MS Bantam (9,312 GRT) and not smaller SS Bantam (3,322 GRT) also operating in the region.) Bontekoe, Van Heemskerk (Note: The 2,996 GRT Koninklijke Paketvaart-Maatschappij freighter of 1909 not to be confused with HNLMS Jacob van Heemskerck (1939).) and Van Heutsz bound for Port Moresby with 4,735 troops of the Australian 14th Brigade.

A month later, the destroyer was assigned to convoy escort duties along the Australian coast, and again began escorting convoys to New Guinea in early August. In this role she first saw action when she attacked and sank the Japanese Kaichū type submarine Ro-33 off Port Moresby on 24 August 1942, killing all 42 men aboard.

On 4 September 1942 Arunta departed Port Moresby to join the cargo ship MV Anshun and the Dutch steamer 's Jacob escorted by and HMAS Swan that had departed from Townsville as convoy "Q2" bound for Milne Bay with supplies for the garrison there. Anshun and Arunta entered the bay on the morning of 6 September where the freighter berthed at the pontoon jetty at Gili Gili to begin unloading with intentions to put to sea for safety during the night but orders were given by local authorities to continue unloading under her cargo lights through the night while Arunta departed to join 's Jacob and Swan holding at sea to the south. Anshun was sunk that night when she came under fire from the Japanese cruiser Tenryū and destroyer Arashi during the battle of Milne Bay.

In January 1943, Arunta took part in the evacuation of Allied guerrillas from Timor before returning to convoy escort duty. The destroyer was relieved from convoy duty in May 1943, and underwent a brief refit before joining Task Force 74 (TF74).

Arunta participated in the Operation Chronicle landings, then detached from TF74 in July and returned to Australian waters for patrol and convoy escort duties and a refit, before rejoining the task force at Brisbane on 29 October 1943. By 5 November the task force, composed of HMAS Australia, HMAS Shropshire, USS Ralph Talbot, HMAS Warramunga, Arunta and USS Helm, was in Milne Bay.

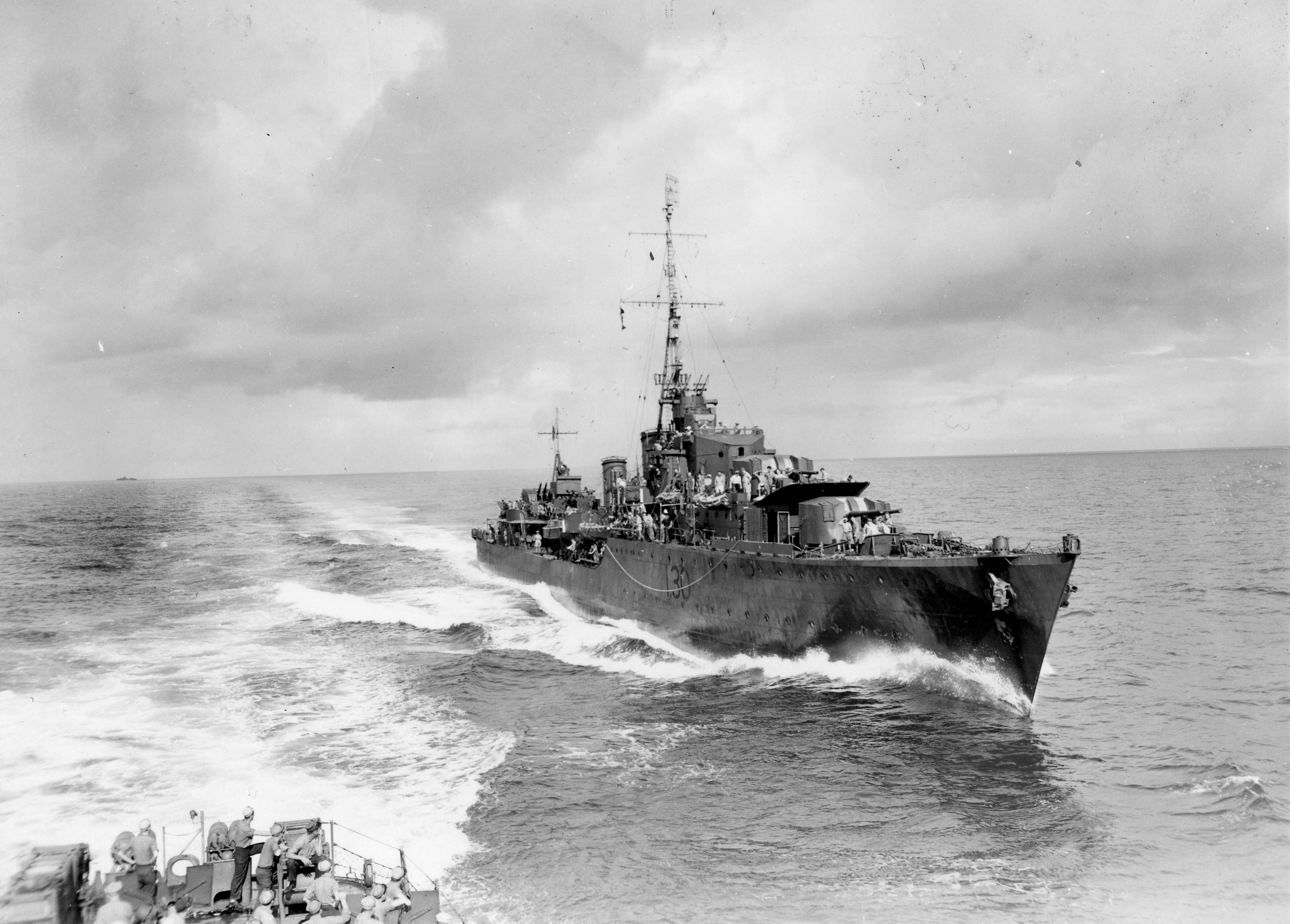
HMAS Arunta in July 1943

In late November, Arunta fired on Japanese ammunition dumps in New Guinea, before providing support for troop landings at Arawe, Cape Gloucester, and Saidor during December 1943 and January 1944. In March, the destroyer transported the United States 7th Cavalry to the Admiralty Islands, before supporting their landing at Hayne Harbour. From April to September, Arunta provided bombardment support for troop landings at Hollandia, Wakde (where she captured a Japanese soldier), Biak, Noemfoor, Cape Sansapor, and Morotai. On 13 October, Arunta formed part of the Allied fleet bound for Leyte Gulf in the Philippines, and was part of the Allied ambush of a Japanese fleet on 25 October; the Battle of Surigao Strait. During January 1945, Arunta supported the landings at Lingayen Gulf; during the approach a near-miss by a Japanese kamikaze aircraft killed two sailors. Between 13 and 15 February Arunta and her sister ship Warramunga sortied from Lingayen Gulf to a point about 300 miles (480 km) west of Manila in preparation to rescue the crews of any United States aircraft which were downed while attacking two Japanese battleships and their escorts which were returning to Japan from Singapore, but this proved uneventful as the planned attacks were frustrated by bad weather.

Following a refit from March to April, Arunta supported the Australian 6th Division on 10–11 May during their landing at Wewak, then provided shore bombardment to aid the 9th Division's landing at Brunei Bay on 10 June. Later in June, she shelled positions in Luton and Balikpapan, the latter as a precursor to the Allied landing on 1 July. Arunta then returned to Sydney for a refit at Cockatoo Island, and was docked when World War II ended.

For her wartime service, Arunta earned the battle honours "Pacific 1942–45", "New Guinea 1942–44", "Leyte Gulf 1944", "Lingayen Gulf 1945", and "Borneo 1945". The ship also carried the honour "Guadalcanal 1942", but it was later determined that she did not qualify. It was later found that the destroyer did not qualify for the Guadalcanal honour, and that her service in the Pacific Theatre started in 1942, requiring the modification of these honours. Arunta operated with task forces of the United States 7th Fleet for most of her wartime career: according to Cassells, the destroyer was one of the most well-known RAN ships among United States forces.

=== Post-war ===
Following her refit, which concluded in October 1945, Arunta was sent to Japan to serve with the British Pacific Fleet (BPF) as part of the British Commonwealth Occupation Force. She remained in Japanese waters until March 1946, and returned in mid-December after a cruise through Papua New Guinea and the Philippines for a second deployment with the BPF, which lasted until early April 1947. In June 1948, Arunta visited several Melanesian islands. At the end of 1949, the destroyer prepared for a modernisation refit, which started in 1950. The refit involved upgrading or replacing several of the destroyer's weapons and sensor systems. Although the modernisation was intended to take less than six months, it took two years, by which time their modifications had already become obsolete.

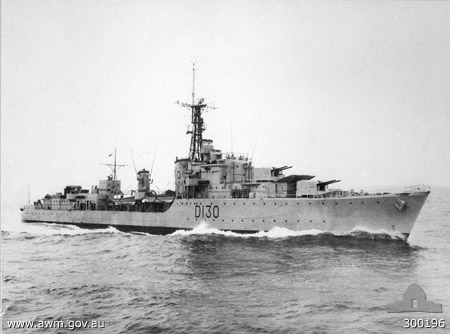
Arunta in November 1952, shortly after re-entering service

On 11 November 1952, Arunta was reclassified as an anti-submarine destroyer, and re-entered service. She spent all of 1953 in Australian waters, and in January 1954 sailed to Korea to support the United Nations enforcement of the June 1953 armistice which ended the Korean War. Arunta returned to Australia in August, and remained there until May 1955, when she joined a flotilla of RAN and Royal New Zealand Navy vessels sailing to Malaya for exercises with the BPF. Instead of returning home in late June, Arunta and Warramunga were refitted at Singapore before becoming the first Australian ships to serve with the Far East Strategic Reserve, which they operated with until December. Arunta was deployed to northern Australia for a cruise during March and April 1956, and visited Norfolk Island and the Pitcairn Islands in June, before arriving in Sydney on 14 June for preparations to be decommissioned.

== Decommissioning and fate ==
After being prepared for placement in operational reserve, Arunta paid off to reserve on 21 December 1956. During her career, she had sailed 357,273 nautical miles (661,670 km; 411,142 mi). The destroyer was maintained until 1 November 1968, when she was sold to the China Steel Corporation of Taipei for breaking up as scrap metal.

Arunta was taken under tow by the Japanese tug Tokyo Maru on 12 February 1969. On 13 February, the ship began to take on water; although there were attempts to stop the flooding, it was decided that recovery would be impossible, and Arunta was allowed to capsize and sink off Broken Bay.
