= Cape Ward Hunt =

Cape on the coast of Papua New Guinea

Coordinates: 08°03′00″S 148°08′00″E

Cape Ward Hunt is a cape on the north coast of Oro Province, Papua New Guinea. The cape was named after George Ward Hunt, First Lord of the Admiralty (1874–1877), by Captain John Moresby.

The cape is a bold, well-wooded point about 46 metres (151 ft) high that rises to an elevation of 180 m inland (590 ft), with a disused 62-metre-tall (203 ft), metal-framework light tower on the point and a conspicuous rock named Craigs Pillar at its eastern extremity. The waters lying between Cape Ward Hunt and Cape Nelson about 87 miles (140 km) distant are described as being:

of the most dangerous character, due to the unsurveyed areas and the numerous coral patches and shoals. The coral patches are steep-to and the sea seldom breaks on them. The weather is often thick with passing squalls of rain, and anchorages are rare close to land. Between coral patches only a few miles apart [half-dozen km], a sounding of several hundred meters [1,600 to 2,500 ft] may be obtained.

A radar of the Royal Australian Air Force manned by No. 315 Radar Station RAAF was located upon Cape Ward Hunt from 12 April 1943 until 4 October 1944 during World War II.

== References cited ==
- National Geospatial-Intelligence Agency (2011). Pub. 164 Sailing Directions (Enroute)—New Guinea. Sailing Directions (Enroute). Springfield, Virginia: United States Government—National Geospatial-Intelligence Agency.
- Pacific Wrecks. "Cape Ward Hunt". Pacific Wrecks.com.
- Radar Returns. "Unit: 315RS". Radar Returns.
