= Cape Nelson (Papua New Guinea) =

Cap in Oro Province, Papua New Guinea

Coordinates: 08°59′51″S 149°15′01″E

Cape Nelson is a cape on the north coast of Oro Province, Papua New Guinea. The cape was named by Captain John Moresby in 1874 commanding HMS Basilisk after Lord Horatio Nelson.

Cape Nelson lies on the northern extremity of a peninsula with a coast broken by narrow fjord like inlets and Mount Victory, an active volcano with a height of 1,884 metres (6,181 ft), as its highest feature with the cape itself composed of grassy slopes rising to mountains with a fringing reef and numerous off shore reefs. The Hall Point light (9°03'S., 149°18'E.) lies about 4.5 miles (7.2 km) southeast of the cape. The waters between Cape Nelson and Cape Ward Hunt, lying about 87 miles (140.0 km) to the north-west, are described as being:

of the most dangerous character, due to the unsurveyed areas and the numerous coral patches and shoals. The coral patches are steep-to and the sea seldom breaks on them. The weather is often thick with passing squalls of rain, and anchorages are rare close to land. Between coral patches only a few miles apart, a sounding of several hundred meters may be obtained.

During World War II finding a route for supply by sea from Milne Bay to Cape Nelson through the Ward Hunt Strait past Cape Vogel and then through Collingwood Bay in support of the operation to take Buna was of critical importance as the Japanese control of open sea approaches to the north required ships to pass in the dangerous and almost uncharted inshore waters approaching Cape Nelson and it was only after difficult survey efforts that larger ships were able to supply that campaign. That work was first done by luggers and small ships joined later by HMAS Paluma in surveying, installing lights, landing shore parties for reconnaissance, establishing radio stations and piloting ships through the discovered channels.

== See also ==
Operation Lilliput

== References cited ==
- Gill, G. Hermon (1968). Royal Australian Navy 1939-1942. Australia in the War of 1939–1945. Series 2 – Navy. Vol. 2. Canberra: Australian War Memorial.
- Milner, Samuel (1957). Victory in Papua. United States Army In World War II. Washington, DC: Center Of Military History, United States Army. LCCN 56-60004.
- National Geospatial-Intelligence Agency (2011). Pub. 164 Sailing Directions (Enroute)—New Guinea. Sailing Directions (Enroute). Springfield, Virginia: United States Government—National Geospatial-Intelligence Agency.
