= SS Karsik =

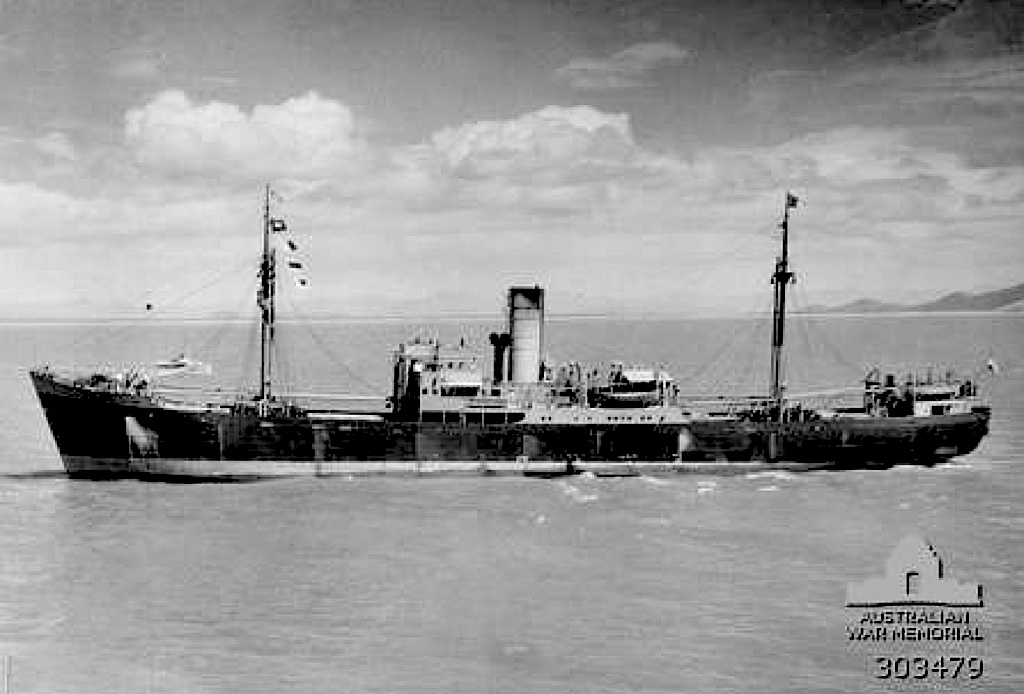
- Karsik in May 1941

History
- Name: Soneck (1938–40); Karsik (1940–63); Pearl of Victoria (1963–67)
- Owner: DDG Hansa (1938–40); KPM (1940–42); Dutch government (1943–)
- Operator: DDG Hansa (1938–40); KPM (1940–63)
- Port of registry: Bremen (1938–40); Dutch (no port stated, 1940–45)
- Builder: Deschimag, Wesermünde
- Yard number: 597
- Launched: 1938
- Identification: call sign DOUJ (1938–40); call sign PKDI (1940–63); call sign HOYK (1963–67); IMO number: 541291
- Fate: Wrecked 17 June 1967

General characteristics
- Type: Cargo ship
- Tonnage: 2,191 GRT (1938–43); 3,057 GRT (1944–)
- Length: 305.2 ft (93.0 m)
- Beam: 44.8 ft (13.7 m)
- Depth: 16.7 ft (5.1 m)
- Decks: 2
- Installed power: 367 NHP
- Propulsion: 3-cylinder triple-expansion engine; plus exhaust steam turbine
- Speed: 12 knots (22 km/h)
- Sensors & processing systems: wireless direction finding; echo sounding device
- Notes: sister ship: Schwaneck

SS Karsik was a German-built cargo steamship. Deutsche Schiff- und Maschinenbau (Deschimag) built her as Soneck for Deutsche Dampfschifffahrts-Gesellschaft "Hansa" in 1938.

The Royal Netherlands Navy seized her in the Dutch East Indies in 1940. She was renamed Karsik and the Dutch Koninklijke Paketvaart-Maatschappij (KPM) operated her until 1963.

In 1963 she was sold, renamed Pearl of Victoria and registered in Panama. She was wrecked in the Red Sea in 1967.

== Building ==
Deschimag built Soneck at its Seebeckwerft in Wesermünde, which is now part of Bremerhaven. As built, her tonnages were 2,191 GRT and 1,040 NRT.

Soneck had a three-cylinder triple-expansion engine plus a Bauer-Wach low-pressure exhaust steam turbine. Exhaust steam from the low-pressure cylinder of the triple-expansion engine powered the turbine. The turbine drove the same shaft as the piston engine by double-reduction gearing and a Föttinger fluid coupling.

The combined power of her piston engine and turbine was 367 NHP. Between them the engines gave Soneck a speed of 12 knots (22 km/h).

In 1939 Deschimag built a sister ship, Schwaneck, to the same dimensions for DDG Hansa.

== World War II seizure and service ==
On 10 May 1940 crew of HNLMS Java seized Soneck for the Dutch government, who renamed her Karsik and contracted Koninklijke Paketvaart-Maatschappij (KPM) to operate her in the Dutch East Indies as a train ferry.

Karsik was one of 21 KPM vessels that took refuge in Australian ports after the fall of Java that Dutch officials requested be put into service for the war effort. The ship, among others, was chartered by the Chief Quartermaster, US Army Forces in Australia (USAFIA) on 26 March 1942 with long term details to be negotiated at higher levels to become part of the US Army's local fleet crewed by its KPM officers and men with the number X-20. (Note: Masterson notes the precise charter agreements for KPM ships were somewhat vague but that the agreements were worked with the War Shipping Administration (WSA) and the owning governments. Some similar ships were chartered by the British Ministry of Transport and allocated through WSA to the Army. That would fit with the DDG Hansa reference's "Am 01.03.1942 verchartert a British Ministry of War Transport, London.")

On the night of 11–12 December 1942 Karsik, escorted by HMAS Lithgow, was the first large vessel to arrive at Oro Bay delivering four Stuart light tanks that were loaded into recently arrived barges and then towed up the coast and landed within miles of the battlefront at Buna. Mayo notes the fact a large ship had arrived and thus the supply line had opened as having perhaps even greater significance than the arrival of the tanks.

Karsik returned on 14 December with a second load of tanks for the forces at Buna. Karsik's first trip with tanks to Oro Bay was named "Operation Karsik" and the second was "Operation Tramsik" and immediately preceded the regular convoys of Operation Lilliput.

In 1944 Karsik's tonnages were revised to 3,057 GRT and 2,115 NRT.

== Post war ==
In 1963 the Leecho Steam Ship Company (Yong and Lee Timber of Hong Kong) bought Karsik, renamed her Pearl of Victoria and registered her in Panama. On 17 June 1967 she struck the Mismari Reef off Jeddah in the Red Sea and was wrecked.
