= MV Anshun =

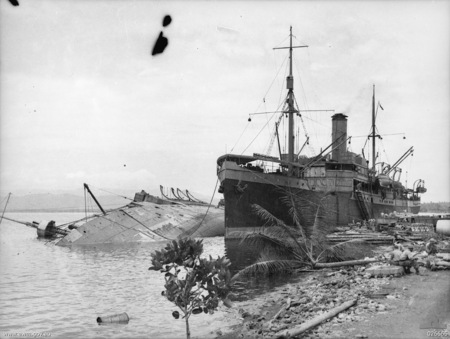
- Anshun lying on bottom at Milne Bay.

History
- Name: Anshun (1930–1946); Culcairn (1946–1962)
- Owner: The China Navigation Co (1930–1941); Ministry of War Transport (1941–1946); James Patrick & Company Pty Limited (1946–1962)
- Port of registry: (United Kingdom) London
- Builder: Scotts Shipbuilding and Engineering Company Limited, Greenock
- Launched: 27 October 1930
- Fate: Scrapped 1966

General characteristics
- Type: Cargo ship
- Tonnage: 3,188 GRT
- Length: 338 feet 4 inches (103.1 m)
- Beam: 50 feet 2 inches (15.3 m)
- Draught: 21 feet 7 inches (6.6 m)

The MV Anshun was a 3,188 GRT motor vessel built by Scotts Shipbuilding and Engineering Company Limited, Greenock in 1930 for The China Navigation Company for the Chinese coastal passenger service.

== Wartime service ==
With the outbreak of World War II, the Anshun was requisitioned by the Admiralty as a stores ship at Freetown, returned to her owners in 1940. The ship was damaged by a bomb on 10 December 1941 at Manila, Philippines. She was diverted to Australia and taken for operation under the Ministry of War Transport for wartime service and in May–June 1942 allocated for operation under United States Army control.

On 2 September 1942 Anshun and the Dutch steamer 's Jacob escorted by and HMAS Swan, later joined by HMAS Arunta out of Port Moresby, left Townsville as convoy "Q2" bound for Milne Bay with supplies for the garrison there. Anshun and Arunta entered the bay on the morning of 6 September and berthed at the pontoon jetty at Gili Gili to begin unloading with intentions to put to sea for safety during the night but orders were given by local authorities to continue unloading under her cargo lights through the night while Arunta departed to join 's Jacob and Swan holding at sea to the south. Shortly after 10 p.m. she came under fire from the Japanese light cruiser Tatsuta and the destroyer Arashi during the battle of Milne Bay. Anshun was hit by ten 5-inch or 5.5-inch shells and settled by the head before rolling onto her side. Two of her American gunners were killed and one American and one ship's gunner were wounded. Useful cargo that had not been unloaded before the action was identified by diver John Johnstone, who had salvaged gold from RMS Niagara, and then salvaged through holes cut in the ship's side but cases of beer allegedly aboard and of some interest to the troops ashore was not found. She was left on her side until late 1944 when she was salvaged, raised, patched and towed to Sydney.

During preparations to advance from Buna toward Lae and Salamaua marking of channels for safe passage of the amphibious forces in the dangerous waters between Milne Bay and Buna was constrained by shortage of material with the steaming and side lights of Anshun salvaged and used in the effort to make Buna a twenty-four-hour port.

Anshun was later salvaged and in 1944 towed to Sydney where she was laid up.

== Postwar service ==
She was acquired by James Patrick & Company Pty Limited, underwent repairs at Cockatoo Island Dockyard and was renamed MS Culcairn. Culcairn operated on the Australian East Coast trade from 1946 to 1962.
