= HMAS Bowen =

Bathurst-class corvette of the Royal Australian Navy

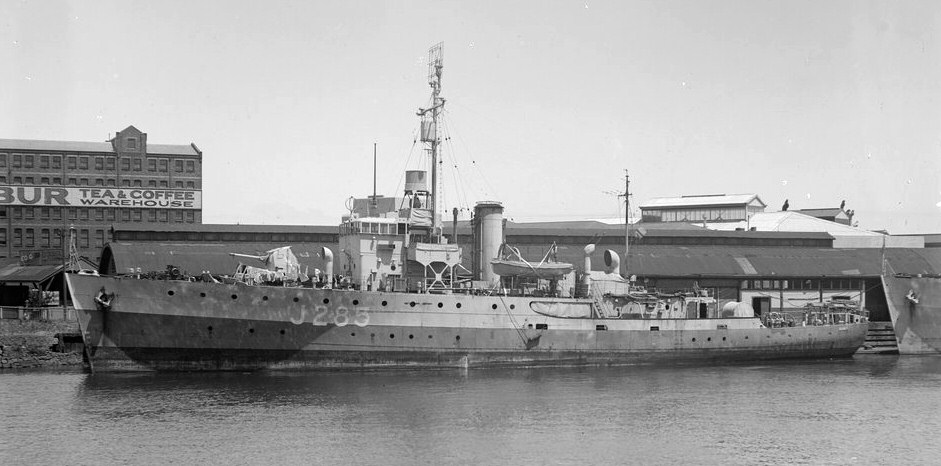
- HMAS Bowen

History

Australia
- Namesake: Town of Bowen, Queensland
- Builder: Walkers Limited
- Laid down: 9 February 1942
- Launched: 11 June 1942
- Commissioned: 9 November 1942
- Decommissioned: 17 January 1946
- Honours and awards: Battle honours: Pacific 1942–45; New Guinea 1943–44
- Fate: Scrapped 18 May 1956
- Badge

General characteristics
- Class & type: Bathurst-class corvette
- Displacement: 650 tons (standard), 1,025 tons (full war load)
- Length: 186 ft (57 m)
- Beam: 31 ft (9.4 m)
- Draught: 8.5 ft (2.6 m)
- Propulsion: Triple expansion engine, 2 shafts
- Speed: 15 knots (28 km/h; 17 mph) at 1,750 hp
- Complement: 85
- Armament: 1 × 4 inch Mk XIX gun, 3 × Oerlikon 20 mm cannons, Machine guns, Depth charges chutes and throwers

HMAS Bowen (J285/M285), named for the town of Bowen, Queensland, was a Bathurst-class corvette of the Royal Australian Navy.

== Design and construction ==
In 1938, the Australian Commonwealth Naval Board (ACNB) identified the need for a general purpose 'local defence vessel' capable of both anti-submarine and mine-warfare duties, while easy to construct and operate. The vessel was initially envisaged as having a displacement of approximately 500 tons, a speed of at least 10 knots (19 km/h; 12 mph), and a range of 2,000 nautical miles (3,700 km; 2,300 mi) The opportunity to build a prototype in the place of a cancelled Bar-class boom defence vessel saw the proposed design increased to a 680-ton vessel, with a 15.5 knots (28.7 km/h; 17.8 mph) top speed, and a range of 2,850 nautical miles (5,280 km; 3,280 mi), armed with a 4-inch gun, equipped with asdic, and able to fitted with either depth charges or minesweeping equipment depending on the planned operations: although closer in size to a sloop than a local defence vessel, the resulting increased capabilities were accepted due to advantages over British-designed mine warfare and anti-submarine vessels. Construction of the prototype HMAS Kangaroo did not go ahead, but the plans were retained. The need for locally built 'all-rounder' vessels at the start of World War II saw the "Australian Minesweepers" (designated as such to hide their anti-submarine capability, but popularly referred to as "corvettes") approved in September 1939, with 60 constructed during the course of the war: 36 (including Bowen) ordered by the RAN, 20 ordered by the British Admiralty but manned and commissioned as RAN vessels, and 4 for the Royal Indian Navy.

Bowen was laid down by Walkers Limited at Maryborough, Queensland on 9 February 1942, launched on 11 June 1942 by Mrs. Crittal and commissioned on 9 November 1942.

== Operational history ==
The corvette operated in the South West Pacific area during World War II, and earned the battle honours "Pacific 1942–45" and "New Guinea 1943–44" for her service.

== Fate ==
Bowen paid off on 17 January 1946 and was sold for scrap to the Hong Kong Rolling Mills on 18 May 1956.
