= SS Bantam =

Transport ship

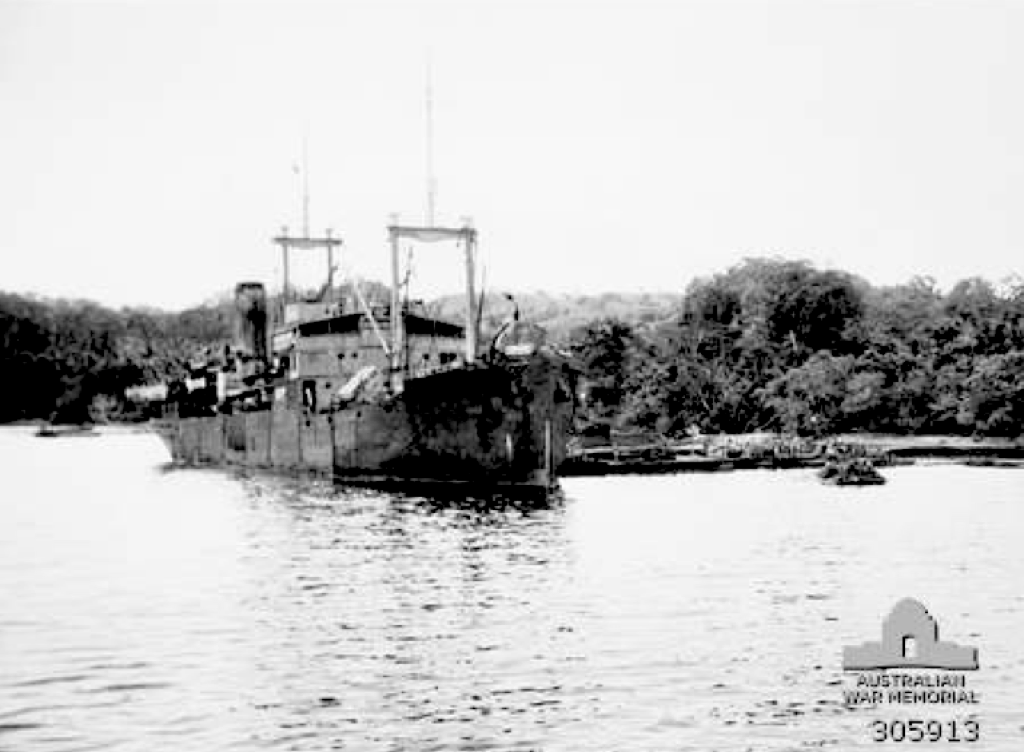
- Dutch transport Bantam alongside the jetty, Oro Bay, New Guinea, 1943 during Operation Lilliput.

History
- Name: SS Bantam
- Owner: Koninklijke Paketvaart-Maatschappij
- Port of registry: (Netherlands) Batavia
- Builder: N.V. Machinefabriek & Scheepswerf van P. Smit Jr. of Rotterdam, Netherlands
- Launched: 1930
- Fate: Scuttled off Sydney in 1946

General characteristics
- Tonnage: 3,322 GRT
- Length: 323 ft (98 m)
- Beam: 48.2 ft (14.7 m)
- Draught: 20.5 ft (6.2 m)
- Propulsion: Triple expansion engines
- Notes: This ship is often confused with the Dutch ship MS Bantam (1939) which was also in the Southwest Pacific Area and overlapping in time. The MV Bantam was a much larger and modern ship with entirely different appearance.

SS Bantam was a transport ship built by N.V. Machinefabriek & Scheepswerf van P. Smit Jr. of Rotterdam, Netherlands in 1930 of 3322 gross weight and operated by Koninklijke Paketvaart-Maatschappij. Bantam, under charter, became a part of the initial United States Army local fleet in Australia, was severely damaged 28 March 1943 in New Guinea and eventually scuttled off Sydney.

== Wartime operation ==
The ship was one of the original twenty-one vessels that reached Australia chartered by the Chief Quartermaster, U.S. Army Forces in Australia (USAFIA) on 26 March 1942 with long term details to be negotiated at higher levels. The eventual decision, involving governments in London, Washington and the Combined Chiefs of Staff, was that the charters through the Dutch government would be handled by the British Ministry of War Transport (BMWT) for the U. S. Army. The complex arrangement was a "bareboat charter to BMWT and through the War Shipping Administration (WSA) the ships were assigned by WSA to the Army but 'not, repeat not, on bareboat but on gross basis,' though under 'full control' of the Army." In early March 1943 almost half the permanent local fleet was composed of the refugee KPM vessels operated by their company crews.

Bantam was operating as part of Operation Lilliput. On 28 March 1943, nine Imperial Japanese Val dive bombers attacked Oro Bay, New Guinea while SS Bantam was alongside a liberty wharf unloading. A total of seven bombs fell on or near SS Bantam. The forward of the bridge, No.3 hold and engine room scored direct bomb hits, while two bombs that hit the liberty wharf tore a hole in the ship's side on the waterline and began taking water rapidly. The ship caught fire as well as the liberty wharf which was burning out of control. The two pontoons of the wharf sank.

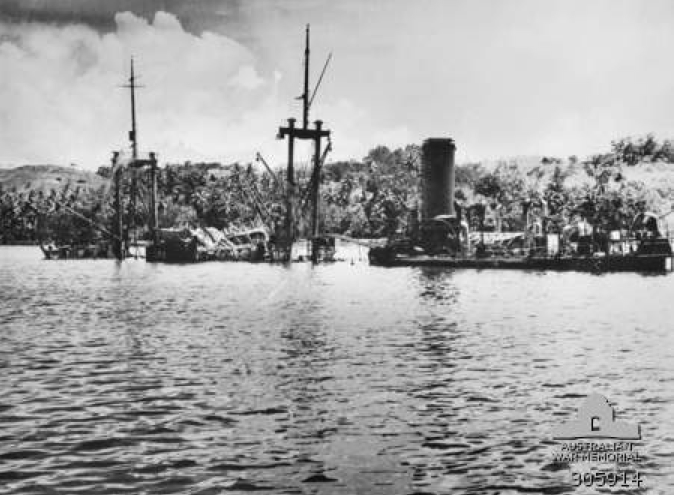
Wreck of the Dutch transport Bantam, Oro Bay, New Guinea.

The Bantam was sinking and it was decided to beach her and a couple of large motor boats assisted in pulling the ship away from the wharf. HMAS Bowen went alongside and began to fight the fires. SS Bantam was beached at the head of Oro Bay. The wreck was raised and towed to Sydney, where she was scuttled 36 miles off Sydney on 24 September 1946, after being filled with unwanted chemical warfare agents (CWA).

== Bibliography ==
- Masterson, Dr. James R. (1949). U. S. Army Transportation in the Southwest Pacific Area 1941–1947. Washington, D. C.: Transportation Unit, Historical Division, Special Staff, U. S. Army.
