= HMAS Lithgow =

1940 Bathurst-class corvette

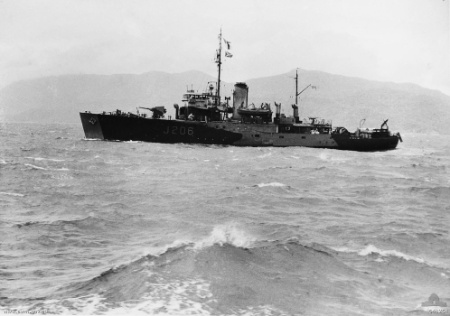
- HMAS Lithgow at Milne Bay, Papua during 1943

History

Australia
- Namesake: City of Lithgow, New South Wales
- Builder: Mort's Dock & Engineering Co in Sydney
- Laid down: 19 August 1940
- Launched: 21 December 1940
- Commissioned: 14 June 1941
- Decommissioned: 8 June 1948
- Honours and awards: Battle honours: Darwin 1942; Pacific 1941–45; New Guinea 1942–44
- Fate: Sold for scrap in 1956
- Badge

General characteristics
- Class & type: Bathurst-class corvette
- Displacement: 650 tons (standard), 1,025 tons (full war load)
- Length: 186 ft (57 m)
- Beam: 31 ft (9.4 m)
- Draught: 10 ft (3.0 m)
- Propulsion: triple expansion engine, 2 shafts
- Speed: 15 knots (28 km/h; 17 mph) at 1,750 hp
- Complement: 85
- Armament: 1 × 4 inch Mk XIX gun, 3 × Oerlikon 20 mm cannons

HMAS Lithgow (J206/M206), named for the city of Lithgow, New South Wales, Australia was one of 60 Bathurst-class corvettes constructed during World War II, and one of 36 initially crewed and commissioned solely by the Royal Australian Navy (RAN).

== Design and construction ==
In 1938, the Australian Commonwealth Naval Board (ACNB) identified the need for a general purpose 'local defence vessel' capable of both anti-submarine and mine-warfare duties, while easy to construct and operate. The vessel was initially envisaged as having a displacement of approximately 500 tons, a speed of at least 10 knots (19 km/h; 12 mph), and a range of 2,000 nautical miles (3,700 km; 2,300 mi) The opportunity to build a prototype in the place of a cancelled Bar-class boom defence vessel saw the proposed design increased to a 680-ton vessel, with a 15.5 knots (28.7 km/h; 17.8 mph) top speed, and a range of 2,850 nautical miles (5,280 km; 3,280 mi), armed with a 4-inch gun, equipped with asdic, and able to fitted with either depth charges or minesweeping equipment depending on the planned operations: although closer in size to a sloop than a local defence vessel, the resulting increased capabilities were accepted due to advantages over British-designed mine warfare and anti-submarine vessels. Construction of the prototype HMAS Kangaroo did not go ahead, but the plans were retained. The need for locally built 'all-rounder' vessels at the start of World War II saw the "Australian Minesweepers" (designated as such to hide their anti-submarine capability, but popularly referred to as "corvettes") approved in September 1939, with 60 constructed during the course of the war: 36 (including Lithgow) ordered by the RAN, 20 ordered by the British Admiralty but crewed and commissioned as RAN vessels, and 4 for the Royal Indian Navy.

Lithgow was laid down by Morts Dock & Engineering Co at Mort's Dock in Balmain, New South Wales on 19 August 1940. She was launched on 21 December 1940, and commissioned into the RAN on 14 June 1941.

== Operational history ==
Lithgow, in company with USS Edsall, HMAS Katoomba, and HMAS Deloraine, sank the enemy Japanese submarine I-124 off Darwin, the first enemy submarine sunk in Australian waters, on 20 January 1942.

In May 1943, Lithgow was one of several ships to search for survivors following the torpedoing of AHS Centaur, with no success.

The corvette received three battle honours for her wartime service: "Darwin 1942", "Pacific 1941–45", and "New Guinea 1942–44".

== Fate ==
Lithgow paid off to reserve on 8 June 1948 and was sold for scrap to the Hong Kong Delta Shipping Company on 8 August 1956.
