= MS Bantam =

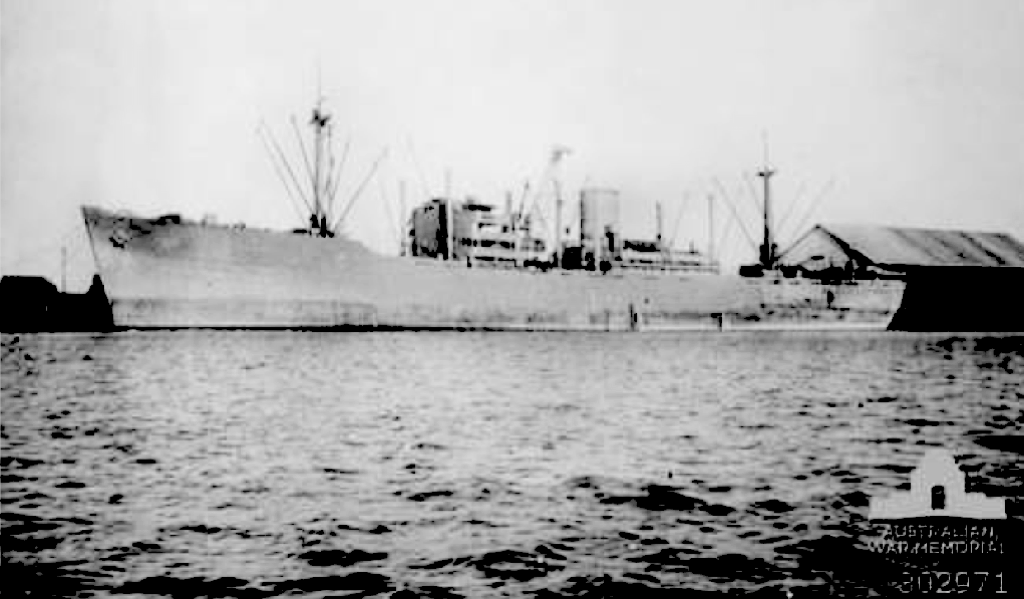
- MS Bantam in undated photo while in Australia 1942-45.

History
- Name: Bantam; Pearl Glory (1964); Mill Star (1969)
- Owner: Rotterdamsche Lloyd
- Operator: Rotterdamsche Lloyd; U.S. & U.K. Charter (probably WSA & BWMT) 1942-46; Rotterdamsche Lloyd (1946); Pacific Pearl Navigation Co. Ltd., Hong Kong (1964); Marmando Compañia Naviera S.A., Panama (1969)
- Port of registry: (Netherlands) Batavia
- Builder: N.V. Machinefabriek & Scheepswerf van P. Smit Jr.
- Launched: 17 December 1938
- Completed: 1939
- Fate: Sold for scrap and scrapped in China in 1971

General characteristics
- Tonnage: 9,312 GRT
- Length: 483 ft 4 in (147.3 m)
- Beam: 62 ft 8 in (19.1 m)
- Draft: 38 ft 2 in (11.6 m)
- Decks: 3
- Propulsion: 2x diesel
- Speed: 15 knots
- Notes: Often confused with the SS Bantam of 3,322 GRT built 1929 (Lloyd's)/1930 (other references) as they were both Dutch with the same name and same builder operating in the same area over a number of years. Even Australian news accounts of the scuttling with munitions of the ship sunk at Oro Bay use this ship's tonnage instead of the actual KPM ship's 3,322 tons even as the MV Bantam was resuming operations in the East Indies. The older ship appears in Lloyd's under the newer ship with only a long dash in place of name.

MS Bantam , 9,312 GRT, was built by N.V. Machinefabriek & Scheepswerf van P. Smit Jr. of Rotterdam, Netherlands in 1939 for Koninklijke Rotterdamsche Lloyd. It was the second ship of the name, the other being SS Bantam (1930) of 3,322 GRT of Koninklijke Paketvaart-Maatschappij and sunk 28 March 1943, from this builder operating in the same region and during overlapping times.

MS Bantam operated under charter by both the United States and the United Kingdom during World War II. It was used in trans-Atlantic convoys from and to New York City on a regular basis from April 1944 to April 1945. The ship was returned to the original owners in 1946.

After wartime service the ship was returned to Koninklijke Rotterdamsche Lloyd in 1946 and resumed cargo and passenger service in the Indies as the colony became Indonesia until sold in 1964. Under the Pacific Pearl Navigation Co. Ltd., Hong Kong the name was changed to Pacific Pearl. In 1969 the ship changed ownership to Marmando Compañia Naviera S.A., Panama with another change to Millstar (possibly Mill Star) until sold for scrapping in China in 1971.

== References cited ==
- Hague, Arnold. "CU Convoys – 1943-1945". Ships in Atlantic Convoys. warsailors.com.
- Hague, Arnold. "UC Convoys – 1943-1945". Ships in Atlantic Convoys. warsailors.com.
- Koninklijke Rotterdamsche Lloyd Museum. "Bantam photo gallery". Koninklijke Rotterdamsche Lloyd Museum.
- Lloyds (1943–44). "Lloyd's Register" (PDF). Lloyd's Register (through PlimsollShipData).
- Swiggum, S.; Kohli, M. (February 3, 2005). "Rotterdam Lloyd / Stoomboot Reederij "Rotterdamsche Lloyd"". TheShipsList. TheShipsList.
- Scheepsfotoruilbeurs (16 January 2013). "ZEEBRIEF#65 (.pdf download from link)". Photomaassluis, Rotterdam. Archived from the original on 8 October 2013.
