= Oro Bay =

Bay in Papua New Guinea

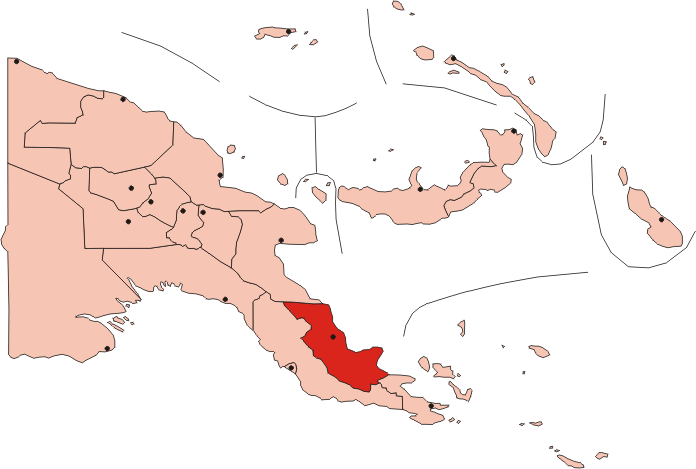
The red area is Oro Province. Oro Bay is the large indentation in the red area, to the SE of the black dot, which represents Popondetta, the provincial capital.

Oro Bay is a bay in Oro Province, Papua New Guinea, located 15 miles (24 km) southeast of Buna. The bay is located within the larger Dyke Ackland Bay. A port is operated by PNG Ports Corporation Limited with limited wharf facilities, located at 8°53′47″S 148°29′39″E.

== History ==
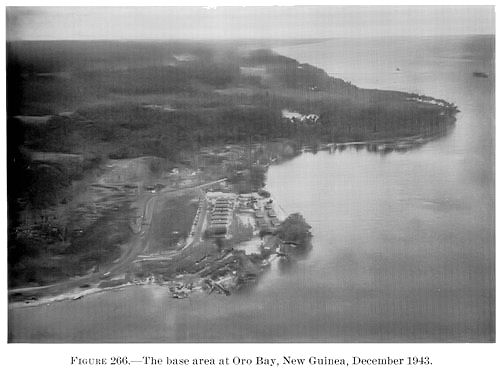
Oro Bay Base in 1943.

During World War II, Oro Bay was used as staging area, the terminus for convoys of Operation Lilliput, for the battle of Buna-Gona and future operations. A United States advanced base was constructed at Oro Bay, with a liberty ship wharf at the southern end of the bay, installations along the shore, and anti-aircraft gun batteries in the surrounding hills. On 28 March 1943, Imperial Japanese planes attacked shipping and harbour facilities at Oro Bay, resulting in the sinking of SS Masaya and SS Bantam. Oro Bay Airfield was also located near here.

The U.S. military carried out 10 executions at Oro Bay between September 1944 and April 1945.

== See also ==
- Oro Bay Rural LLG
