= Kattenburgervaart =

Canal in Amsterdam

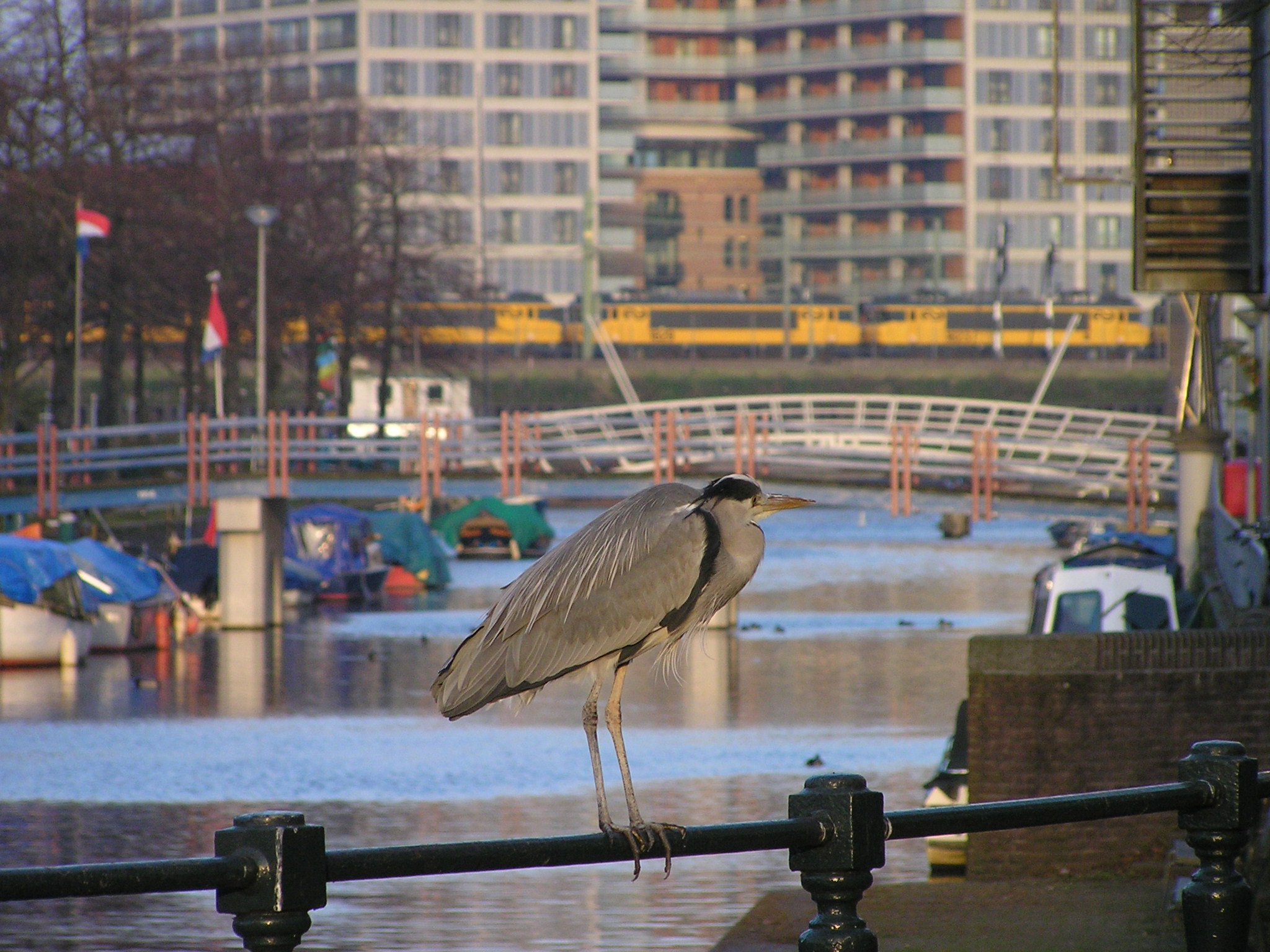
- A grey heron on Witte Katbrug (bridge 1914)

- Location within Amsterdam
- Length: 0.54 kilometres (0.34 mi)
- Location: Amsterdam
- Postal code: 1016
- Coordinates: 52.371858°N 4.920246°E

The Kattenburgervaart is a short canal in Amsterdam that runs through the Oostelijke Eilanden (Eastern Islands). The canal separates the island of Wittenburg, which was built in the 17th century, from the island of Kattenburg. The Kattenburgervaart runs parallel to the Wittenburgervaart (to the east) from the Nieuwe Vaart to the Dijksgracht.

== Bridges ==
Four bridges cross the canal:

- the Paerlduiker (bridge number 91) at the Nieuwe Vaart, between the Wittenburgergracht and Kattenburgergracht streets, which form part of the so-called Eilandboulevard.
- the Kippebrug (bridge number 270), a fixed bridge for cyclists from 1923 in the Wittenburgerkade.
- the Witte Katbrug (bridge number 1914), an arched bridge for pedestrians and cyclists in the Jacob Burggraafstraat.
- the Zebrabrug (bridge number 389), in the Derde Wittenburgerdwarsstraat.

On the extension of the Kattenburgervaart, there were two bridges over the former Binnenhaven. The missing bridges are numbers 268 and 269, the last of which was also known as the Worm bridge .

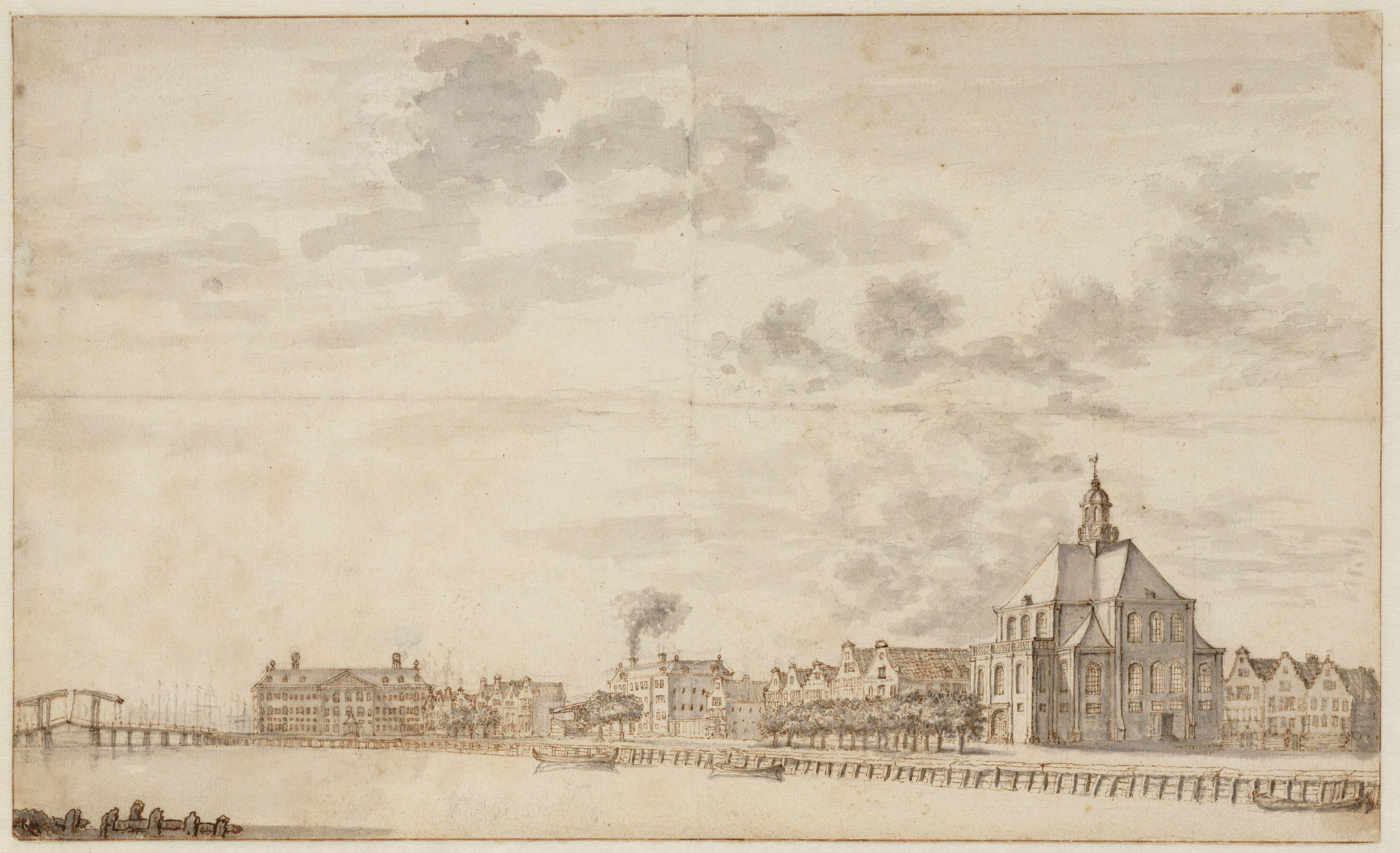

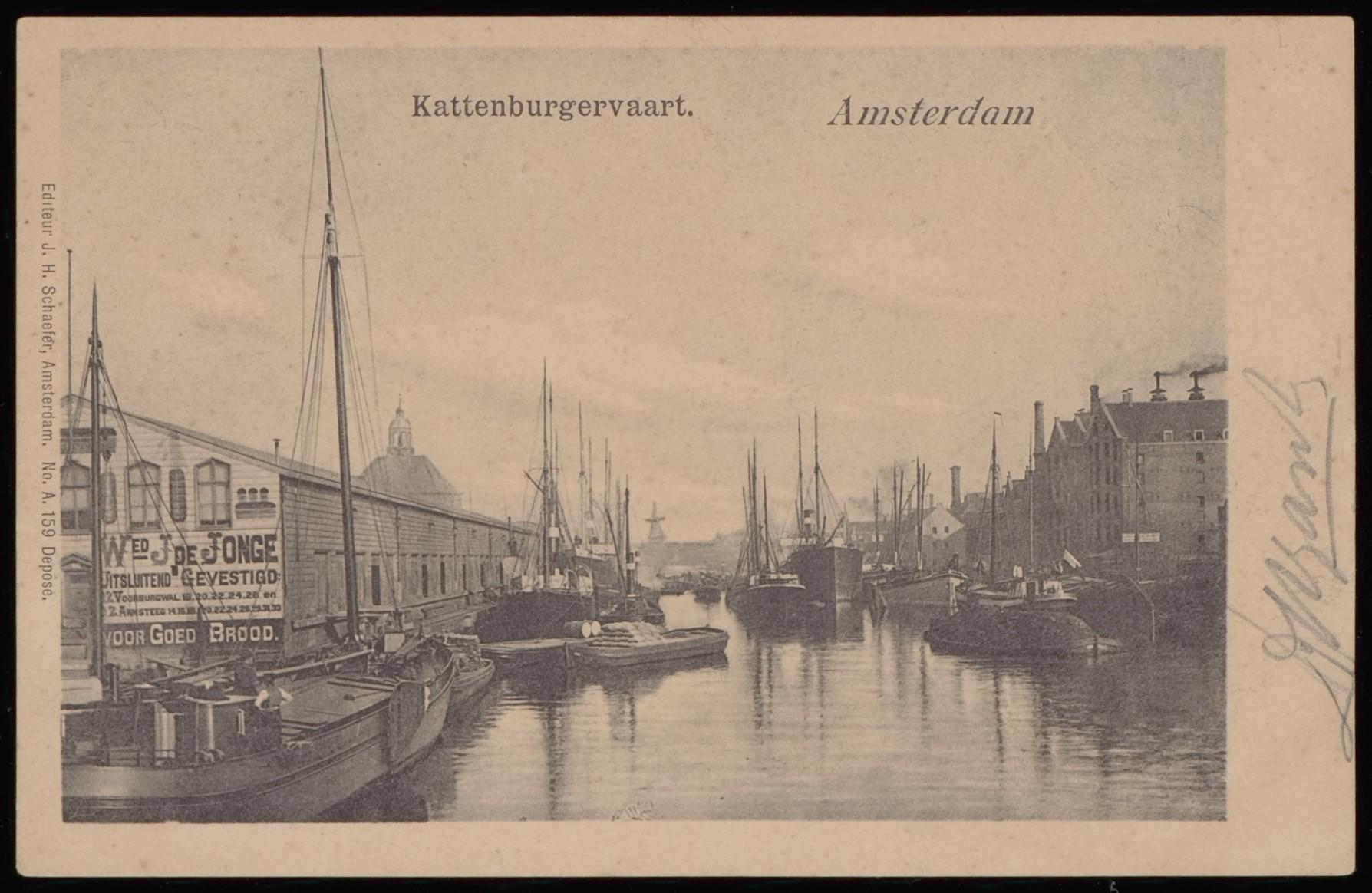
Kattenburgervaart from the Dijksgracht. Left: Oosterkerk. c. 1900

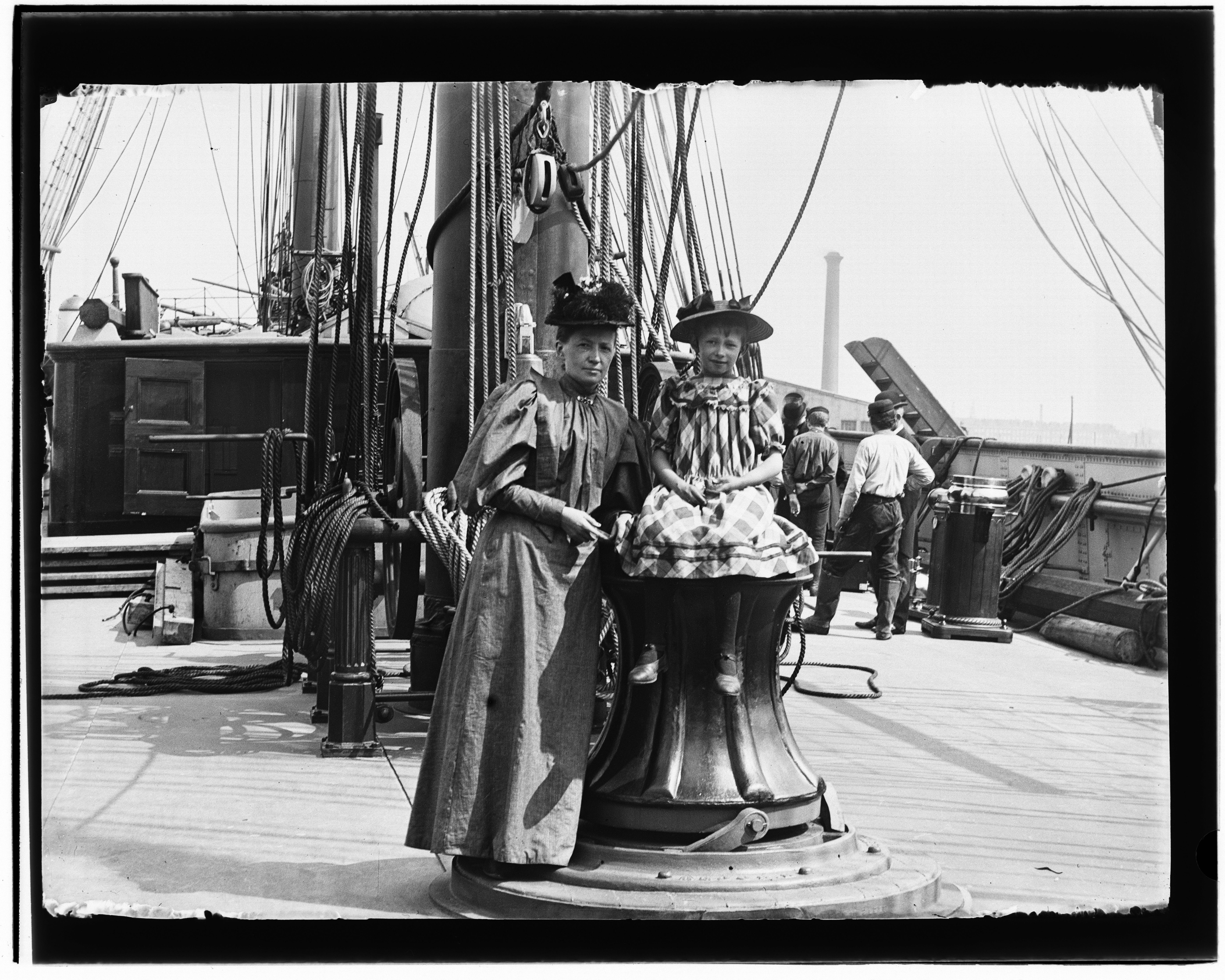
Kattenburgervaart. Three-masted Vondel with Betsy and Cato. Jacob Olie (1895)

== See also ==
- Canals of Amsterdam
