= Oostenburgervaart =

Canal in Amsterdam

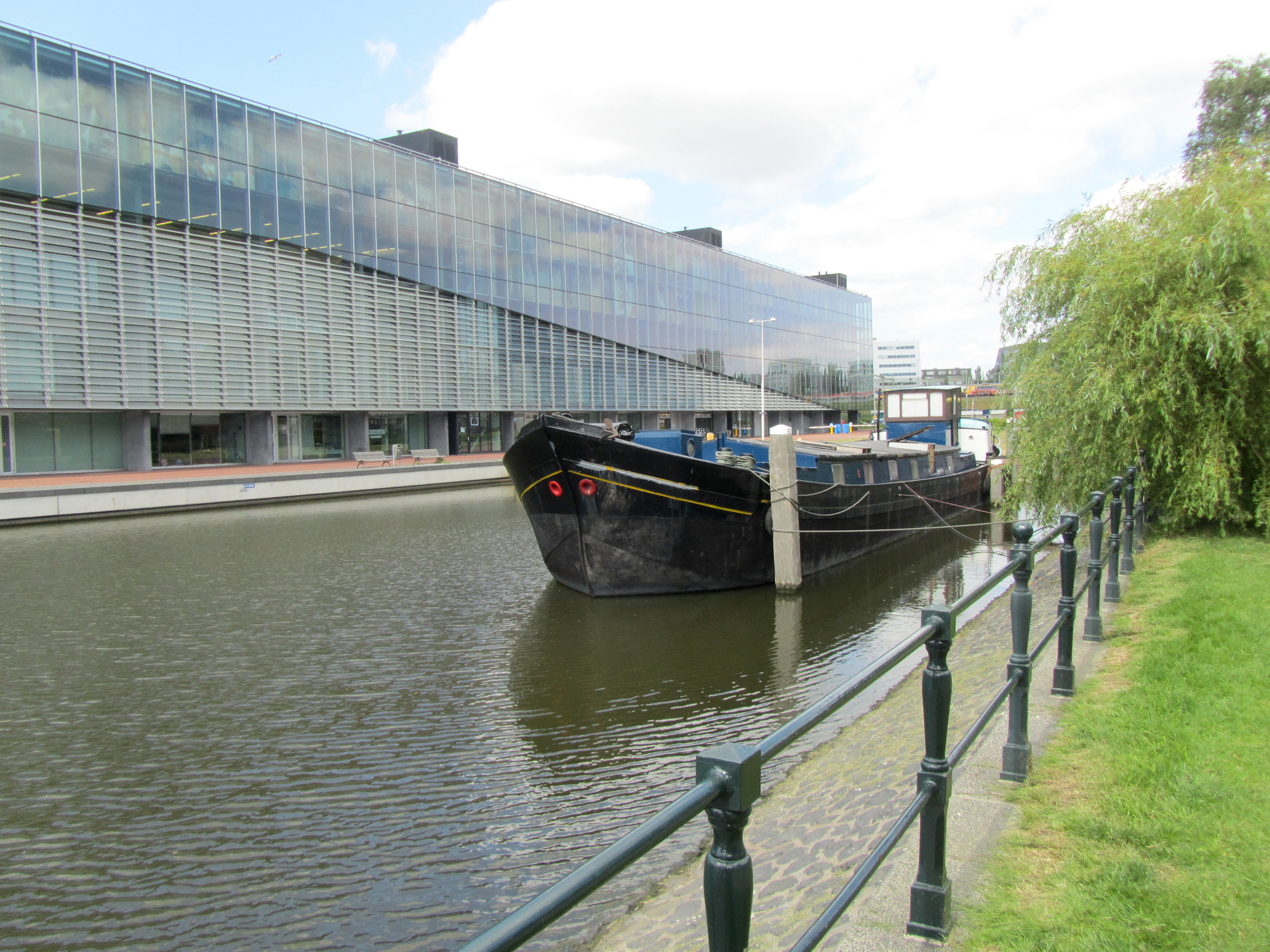
- Northern end of Oostenburgervaart, with INIT office building in the background

- Location within Amsterdam
- Location: Amsterdam
- Postal code: 1018
- Coordinates: 52.370299°N 4.927555°E

The Oostenburgervaart is a canal in the center of Oostenburg island, one of the Oostelijke Eilanden (Eastern Islands) in Amsterdam.

== Location ==
The Oostenburgervaart is rectangular, and runs from the northeast to the southwest. Towards the south of the northwest side the canal is connected via the Oostenburgerdwarsvaart to the Wittenburgervaart. It has no other outlet. To the south of the Oostenburgerdwarsvaart, down to the end of the canal, the canal bank is occupied by former East Indian warehouse of the Dutch East India Company, completed in 1721. The warehouse collapsed in 1822 and a new, smaller warehouse was built on the same site. This building has been used as the "Pakhuis Oostenburg" apartment complex since 1998.

The Oostenburgerpark lies at the southwest end of the canal. A series of four-story apartment buildings along Conradstraat have their backs on the southeast bank. The INIT office building is at the northern end of the northwest bank, down to Jacob Bontiusplaats.

== History ==
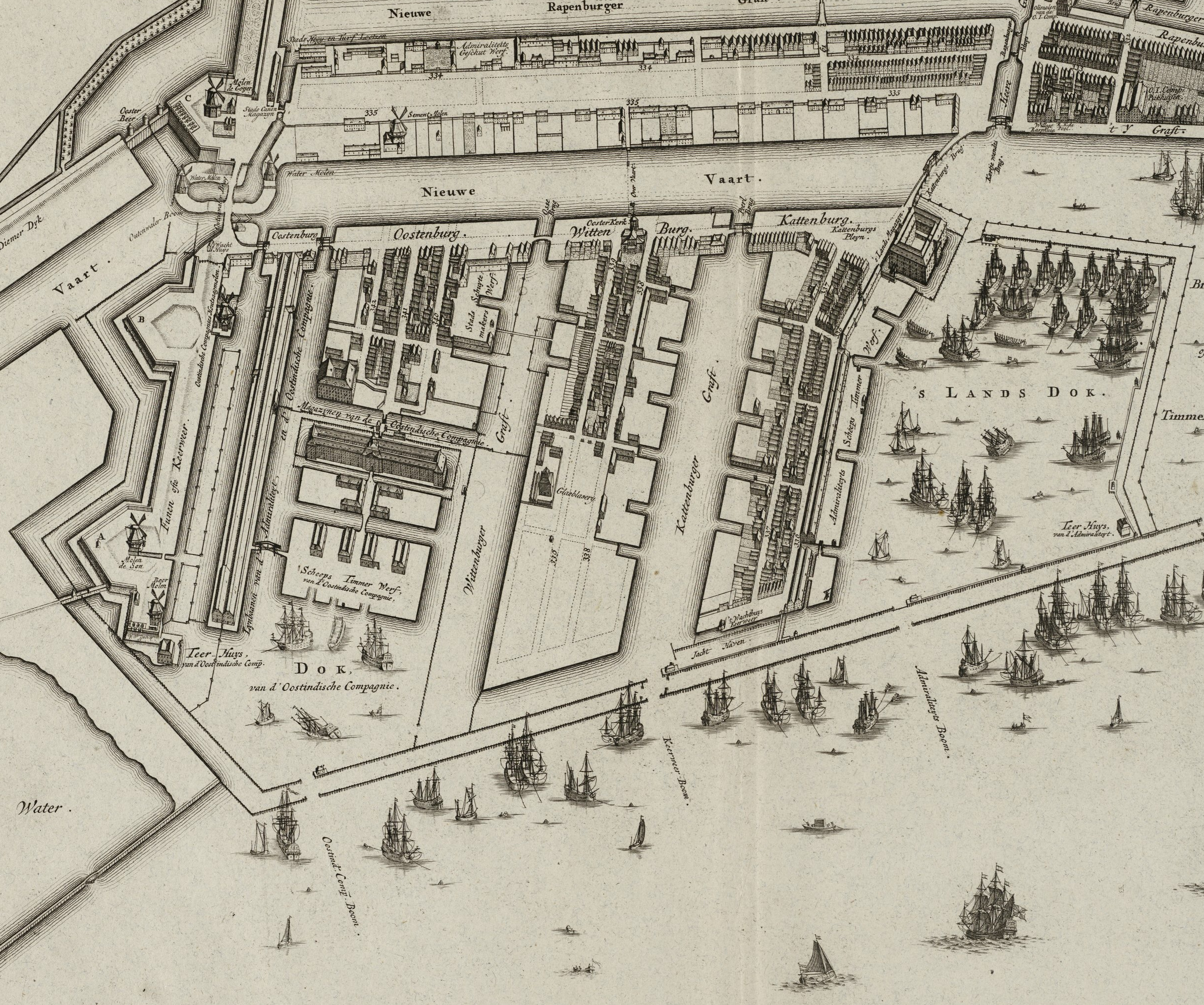
Oostenburg island 1782 (North at the bottom)

Oostenburg island was reclaimed from the swamp along the IJ in the second half of the 17th century, and was purchased by the Dutch East India Company (VOC) in 1661. As shown on a 1782 map, the Oostenburgervaart originally ran from the Nieuwe Vaart north past the company's warehouse and its shipyard to the VOC dock on the IJ. The VOC was dissolved in 1799. Later both ends of the Oostenburgervaart were filled in leaving only the channel to the Wittenburgervaart.

== Development plans ==
In 2015 the state cleared all buildings from the area between the Oostenburgervaart and Ooostenburgermiddenstraat, from Oostenburgerdwarsvaart to Jacob Bontiusplaats to the northwest. On 7 February 2008 a development plan for the area was issued for comment. The plan did not say what would be built, but formalized the zoning plan: 8 stories high on Oostenburgermiddenstraat and up to 6 stories high in the rest of the area. The houses on the Oostenburgervaart would come to the edge of the water. Around 400 homes would be built, mostly 35–45 square metres (380–480 sq ft) rental properties, apart from the homes on the Oostenburgervaart. The rental homes would mostly be privately owned.

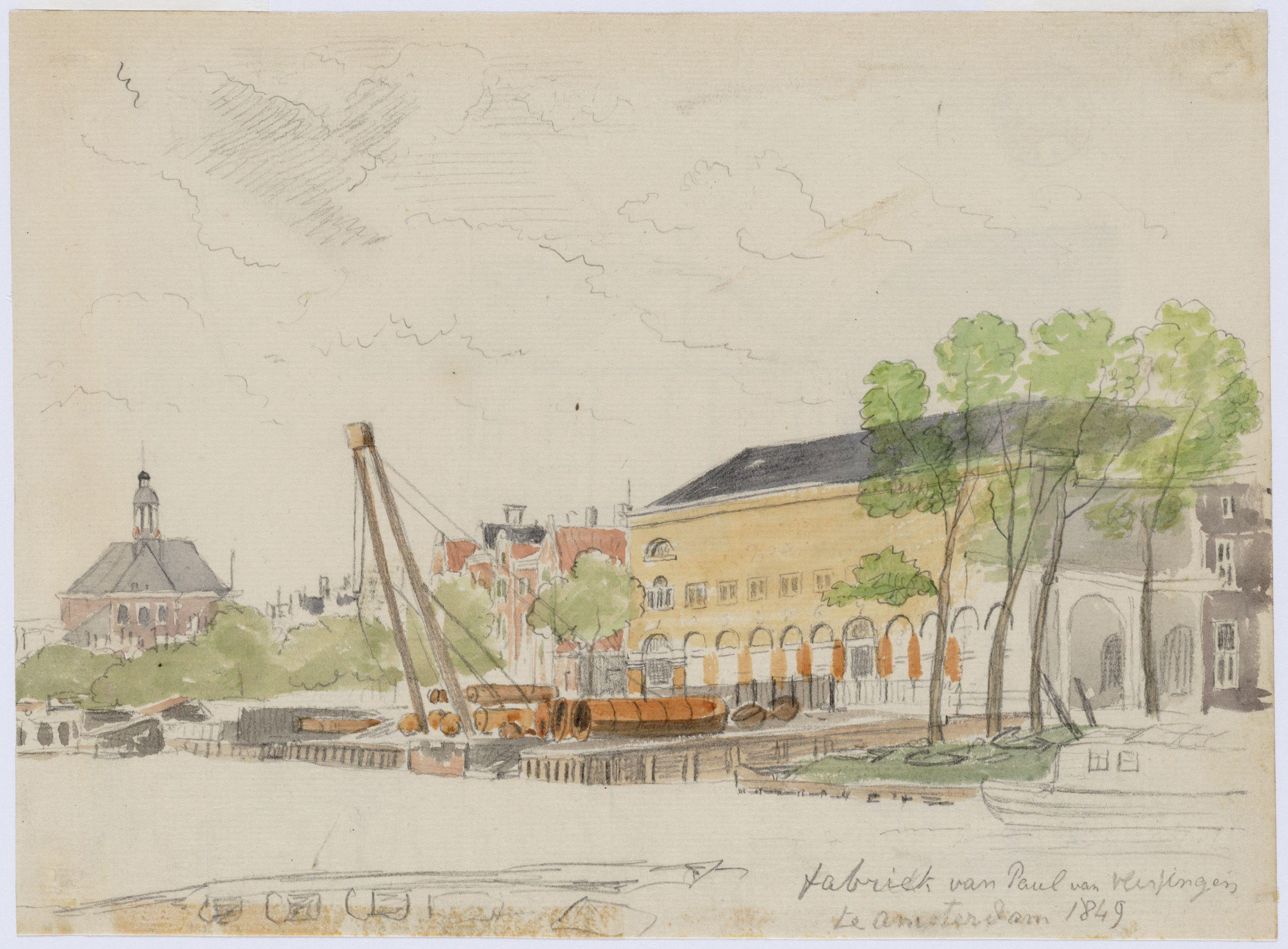
Oostenburgergracht from the southeast (1849). Foreground: Nieuwevaart. Right: Paul van Vlissingen en van Heel and bridge over Oostenburgervaart. Left: Oosterkerk

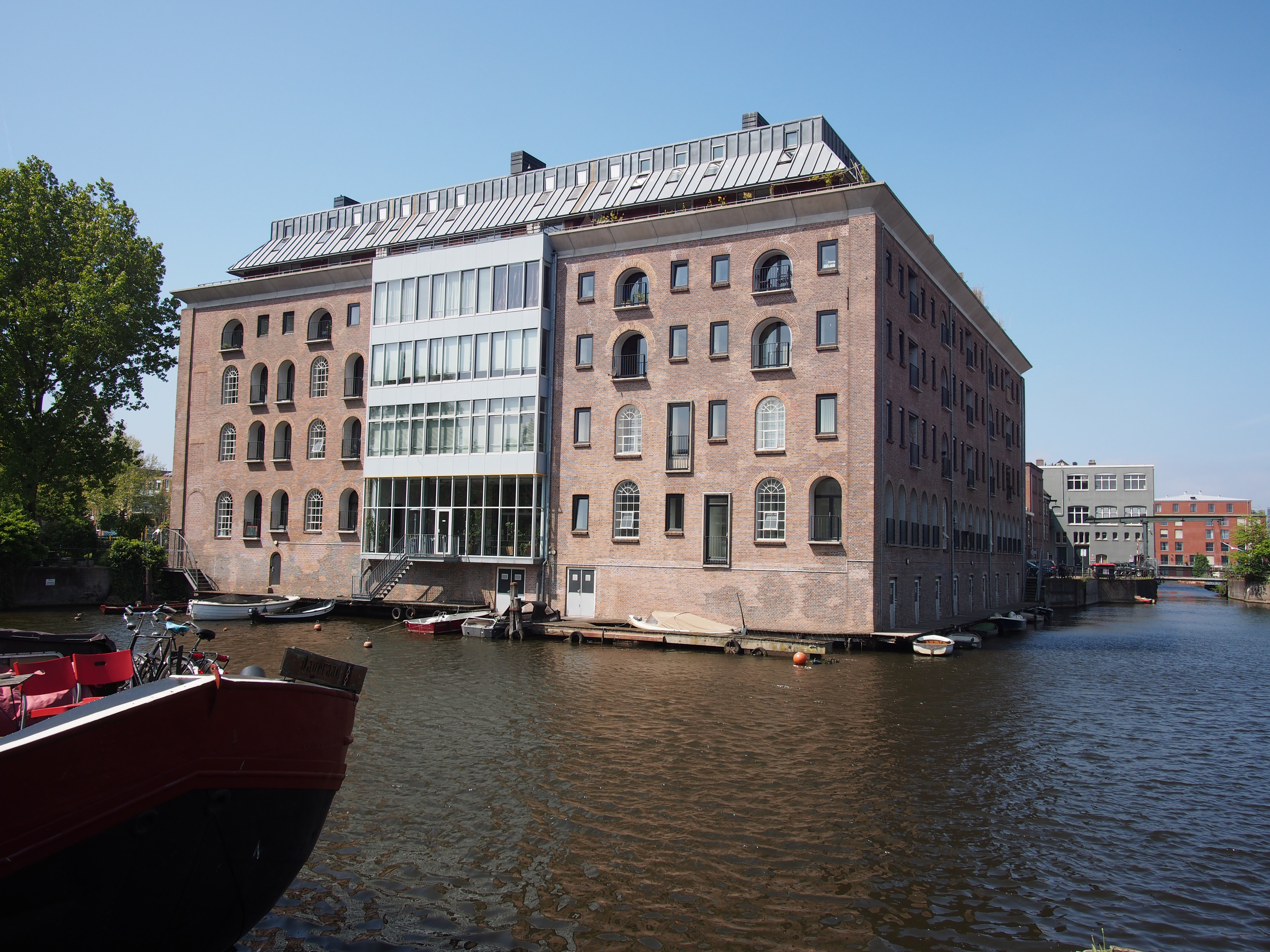
Former East Indian warehouse of the Dutch East India Company on Oostenburg

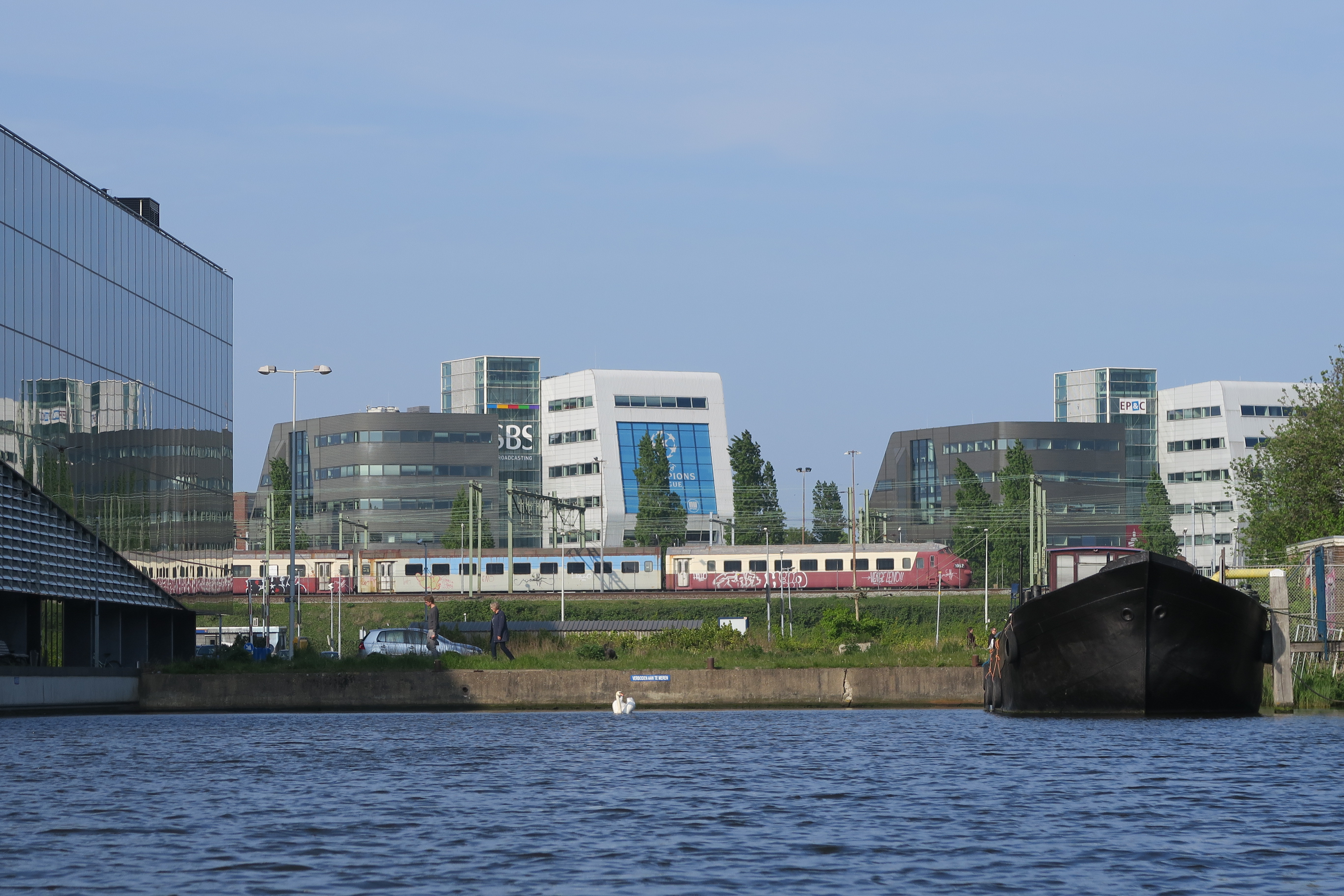
Trans Europ Express train seen from the Oostenburgervaart; INIT building on the left

== See also ==
- Canals of Amsterdam

== Sources ==
- Plot Oostenburg island Oostenburgermiddenstraat in Amsterdam, Biedboek: Central Government Real Estate Agency
- Uitwerkingsplan Oostenburgervaart ligt ter visie t/m 20 maart, 17 February 2018
