= Wittenburgervaart =

Canal in Amsterdam

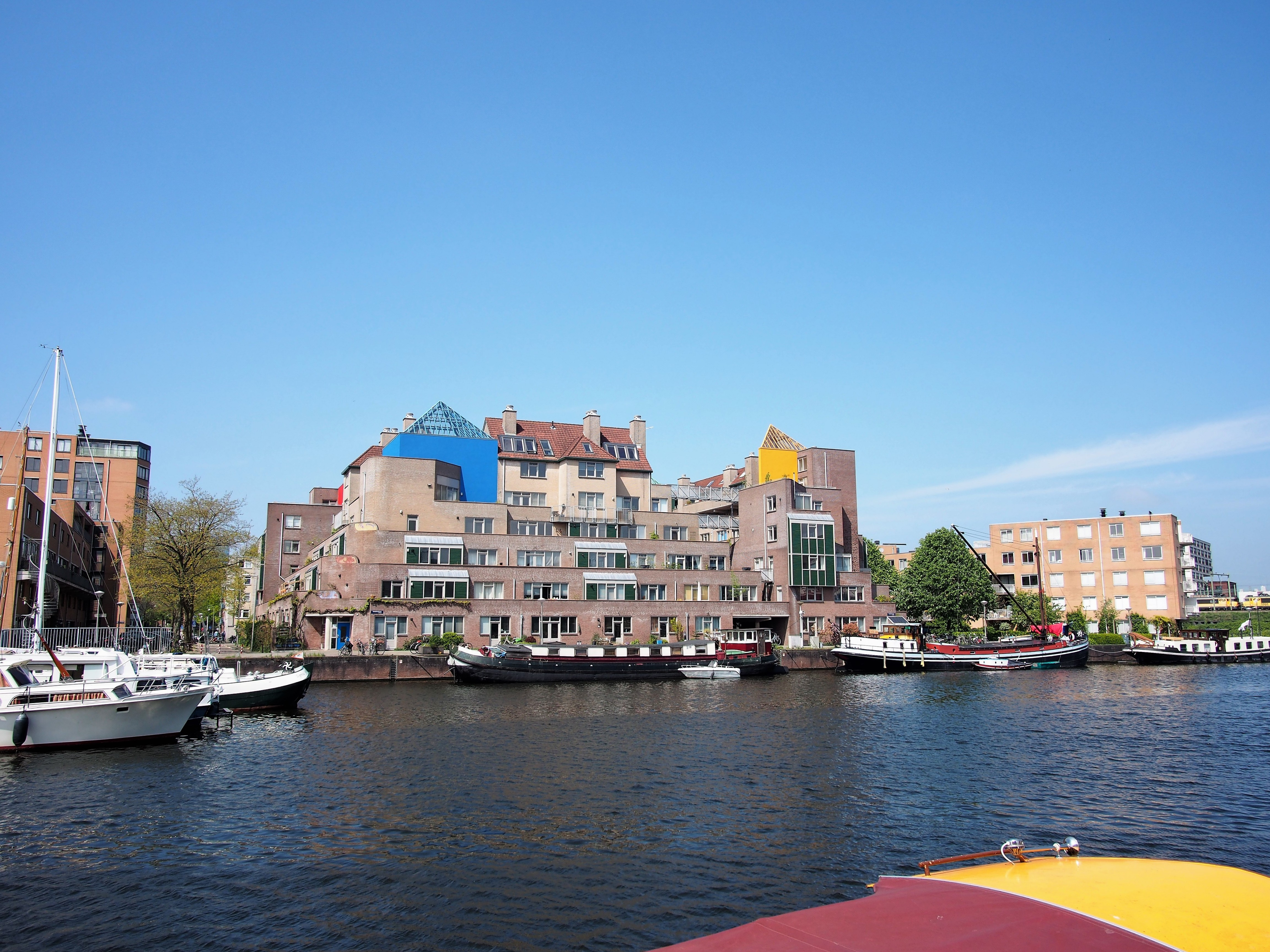

- Location within Amsterdam
- Location: Amsterdam
- Postal code: 1016
- Coordinates: 52.371639°N 4.924556°E
- South end: Nieuwe Vaart
- To: Dijksgracht

The Wittenburgervaart is a short canal in Amsterdam, between the Oostelijke Eilanden (Eastern Islands).

== Description ==
The canal separates the island of Wittenburg, built in the 17th century, from the former islands of Oostenburg and Oostenburgereiland. The Wittenburgervaart runs parallel to the Kattenburgervaart (to the west) from the Nieuwe Vaart to the end of the Dijksgracht. On the south side, the Oostenburgerdwarsvaart, which separates Oostenburg from Oostenburgereiland, leads to the Oostenburgervaart canal.

Two bridges cross the canal:

- The historical Oesjesduiker (bridge number 114) at the Nieuwe Vaart, between the Wittenburgergracht and Oostenburgergracht streets that form part of the so-called Eilandboulevard. This is a low fixed bridge, where all small boats can sail underneath.
- The Ezelsbrug (no. 1904), a drawbridge built in the last part of the 20th century for pedestrians and bicycles, between Wittenburg and Oostenburg.

On the north side on the banks of Wittenburg at the Fortuinstraat is a marina of the water sports clubs Albatros and De Oostvaarders. In addition, there are a few houseboats on the Windrooskade.

In 2012, the artwork Tire Boat (1972) by Robert Jasper Grootveld, was placed on stilts in the water on the south side at the Oostenburgerdwarsstraat next to the Ezelsbrug.

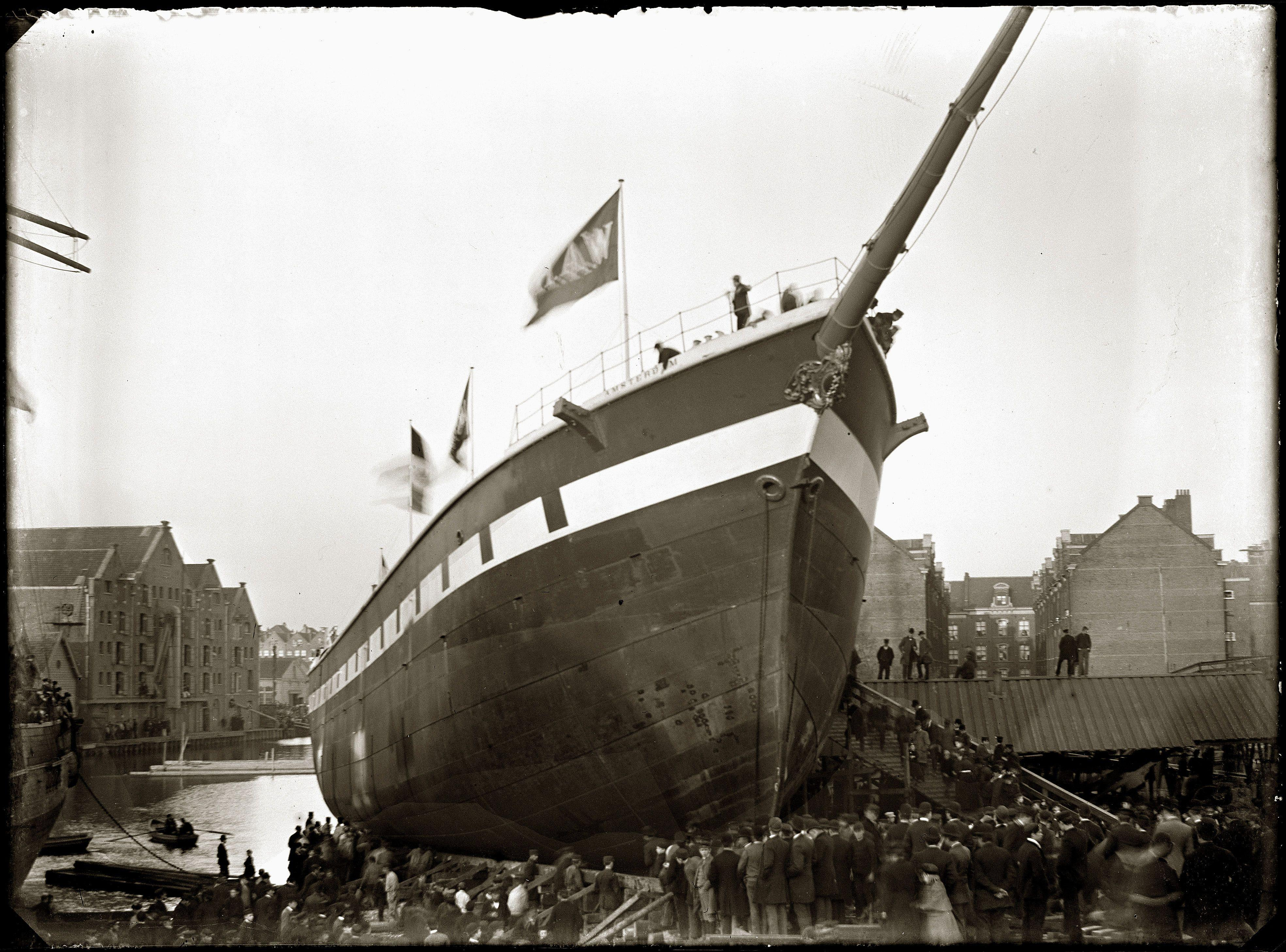
The launch in 1892 of a ship built on the Oostenburgervoorstraat. To the left are warehouses on Wittenburg.

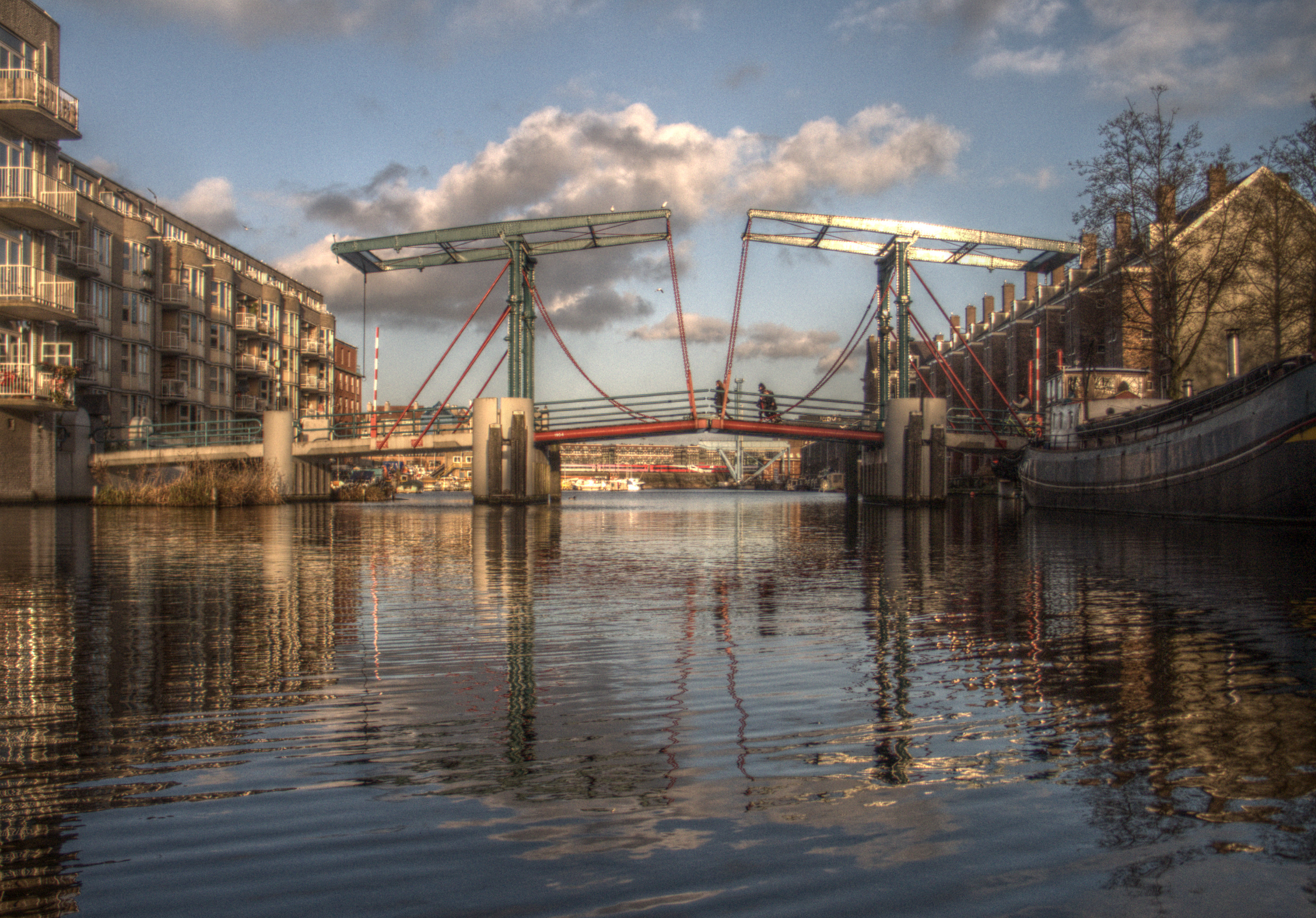
The Ezelsbrug in 2013. In the background the Dijksgracht and the railway embankment it is named after.

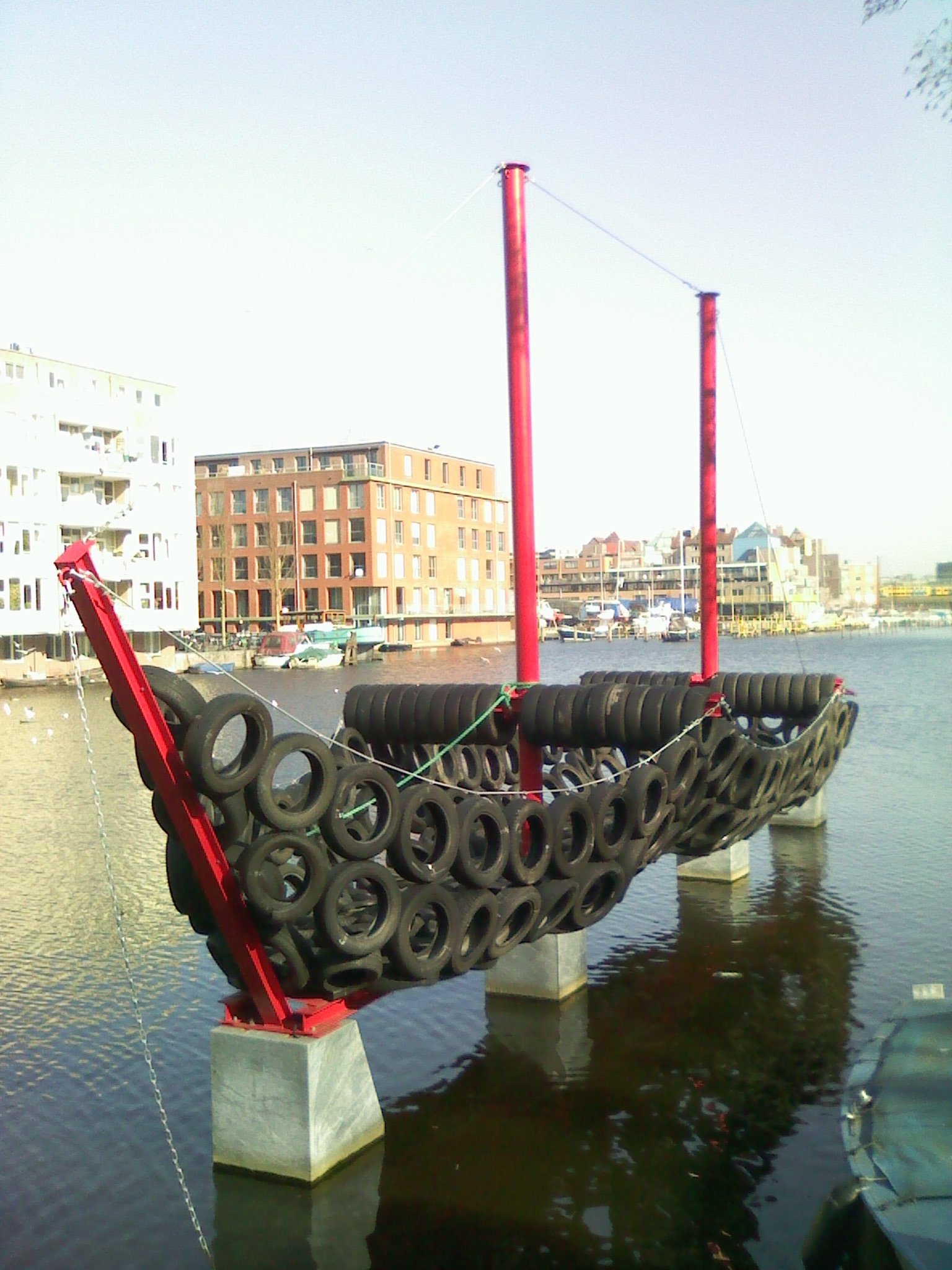
The Tire boat in 2013

== See also ==
- Canals of Amsterdam
