= 1917 Potato riots =

Uprising over food shortage in the Netherlands

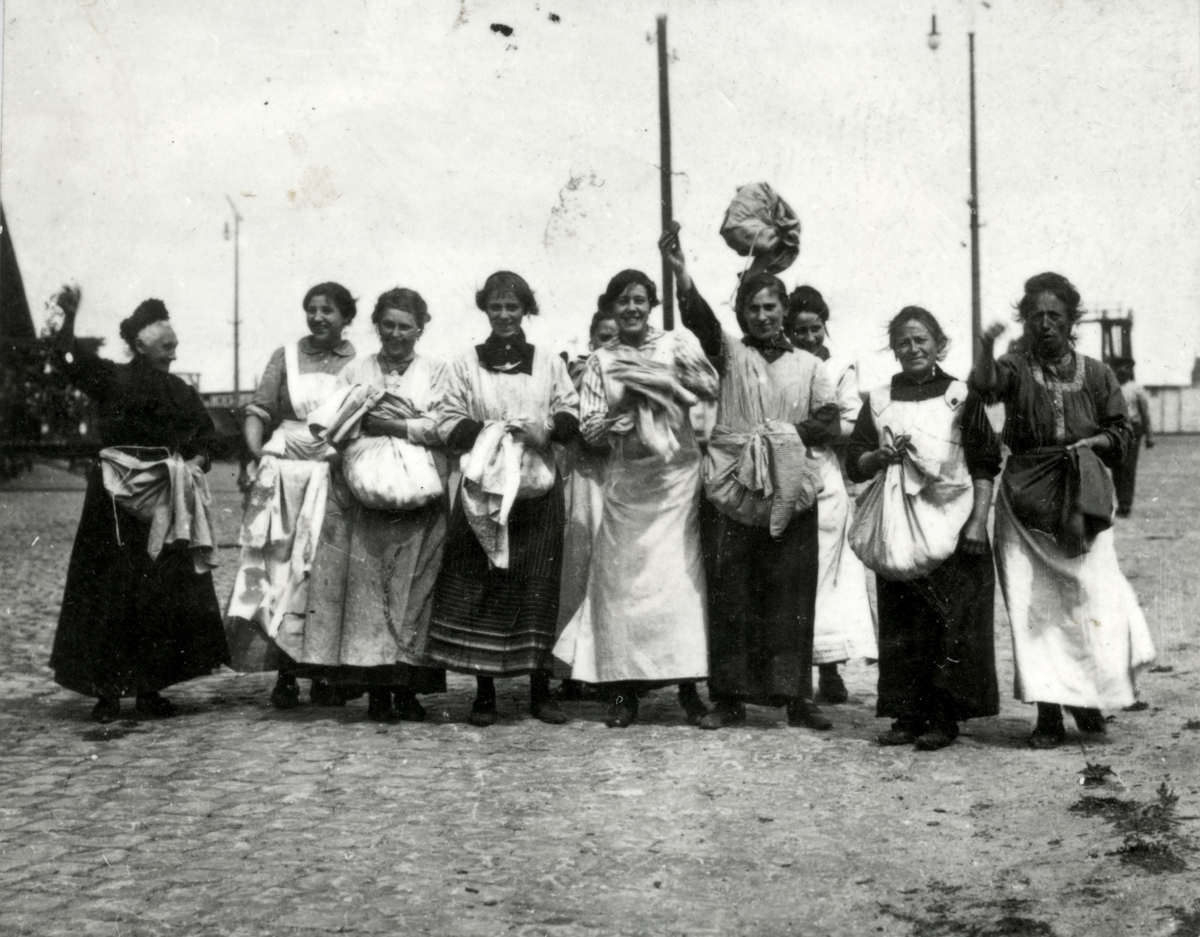
Female workers with potatoes

The Potato riots in June–July 1917 was a popular uprising in the Dutch capital city Amsterdam that was caused by the food shortage in the Netherlands during World War I.

== History ==
In the beginning of the 20th century, food was more within the reach of the workers. The First World War changed this. The Netherlands remained a neutral country, but experienced discomfort and hard circumstances. Imports and exports of goods stagnated. Bread and other food was rationed and soup kitchens sprang up. A bread ration was established in January 1917. On 28 June 1917, there was a shortage of potatoes. It became known in the neighborhoods of Amsterdam that there was a ship with potatoes in the Prinsengracht, but these were for the army. In order to feed their families, the working women of the Eastern Islands and the Czar Peter Neighborhood plundered the ship. According to the Councillor Josephus Jitta, there was no overall shortage of food as the workers had an extra supply of rice provided.

=== Rebellion ===
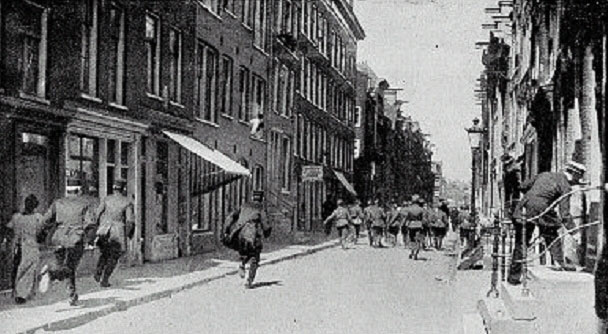
Police vs. Civilians during the Riots.

In the first week of July of that year, the unrest grew and the workers themselves also saw action. Warehouses and shops were looted. The police were powerless and the army acted. The revolt culminated in a battle on 5 July 1917, in which soldiers opened fire on a crowd that had gathered at the Haarlemmerplein. The revolt was beaten. There were nine dead and 114 people wounded.

== Post 1917 food shortages ==
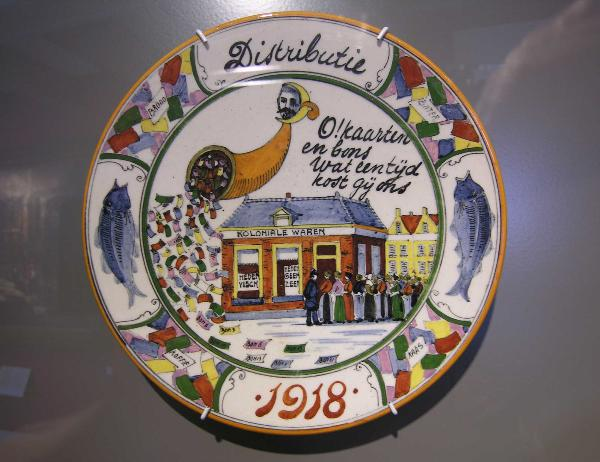
Memorial plate

The food situation deteriorated further in 1918, the last year of the war. Many people lived on the brink of starvation and unemployment rose. The Spanish flu epidemic hit and killed thousands of people, weakened as they were by starvation. The armistice on 11 November 1918 came just in time for the Netherlands. For the workers another winter of hunger and cold was prevented, as well as an impending revolution (Red Week).
