= Entrepotdoksluis =

Bridge in Amsterdam

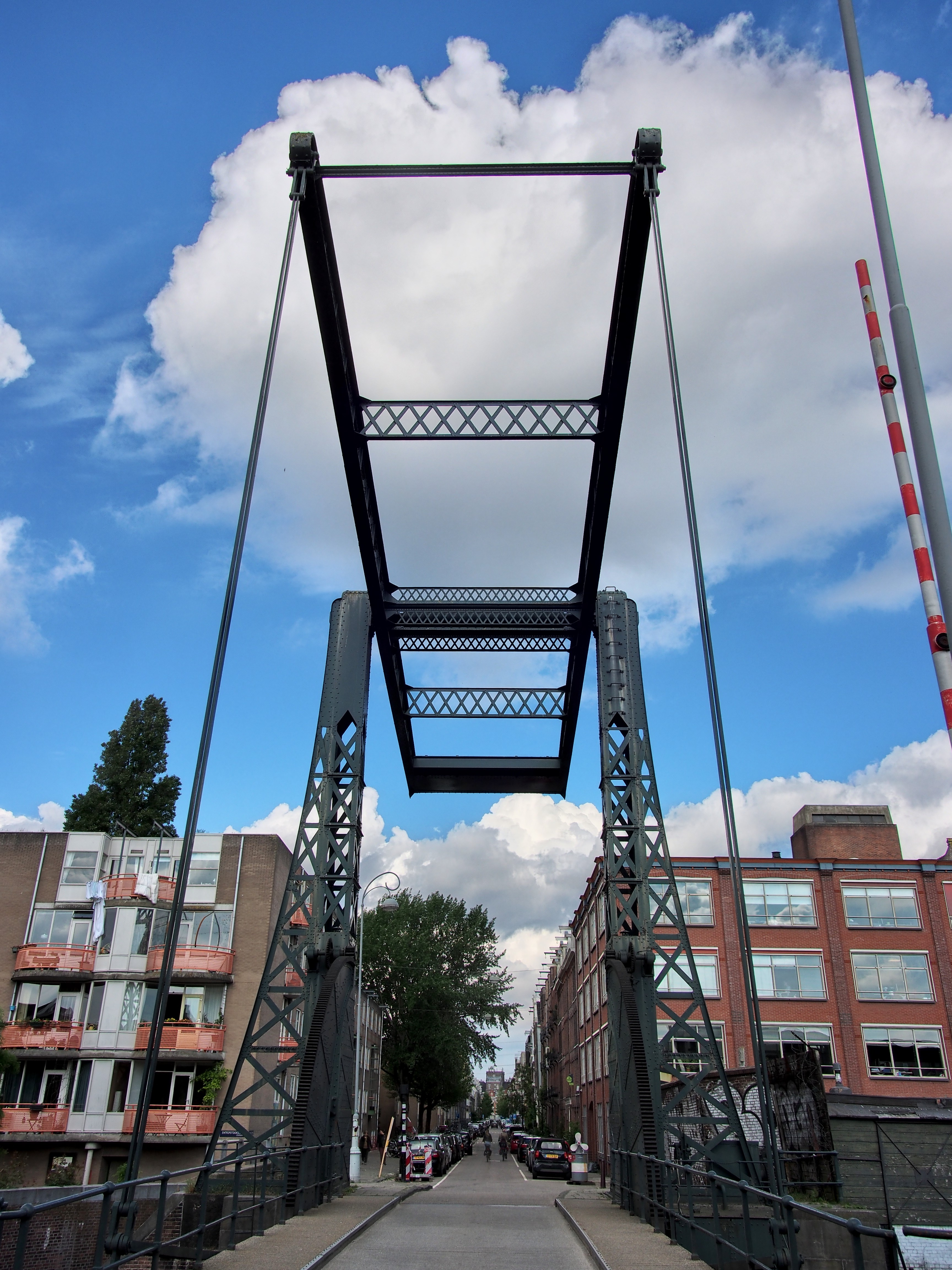
- Entrepotdoksluis (May 2017)
- Coordinates: 52.367964°N 4.919278°E
- Carries: Hoogte Kadijk
- Crosses: Entrepotdok
- Heritage status: Rijksmonument
- ID number: 518397

Characteristics
- Design: Drawbridge
- Material: Iron/steel
- Longest span: 13.44 metres (44.1 ft)
- No. of spans: 1
- Clearance below: 3.02 metres (9.9 ft)

History
- Architect: Wichert Arend de Graaf
- Construction start: 1902
- Construction end: 1903

The Entrepotdoksluis (bridge no. 80) is a bridge in Amsterdam-Centrum that crosses a lock by the same name.

== Location ==
The bridge is located in the Hoogte Kadijk and spans the north side of the Entrepotdoksluis (a canal lock), which leads from the Entrepotdok to the Nieuwe Vaart. The bridge has been a rijksmonument (national monument) since 2001. The bridge has a passage opening of 13.44 metres (44.1 ft) wide and a passage height of 3.02 metres (9.9 ft) The bridge gave access to the Entrepotdok, an inland port built in 1827 where imported goods were stored until the import duties were paid.

== Background ==
The current Entrepotdoksluis (lock) was opened in 1840. A double wooden drawbridge was then built over it. As the shipping was still busy, the bridge could not be replaced by a fixed bridge when it was repaired. Around 1902, the municipality opted for an iron/steel drawbridge. In September 1902, the first tender was made, 16 m³ of granite had to be delivered to this bridge. According to the Monuments Register and Frank V. Smit, the bridge was built in 1903.

== Design ==
The monuments register described the bridge in August 2017 as follows: a single seesaw or drawbridge with passage designed by the Public Works Department. It has abutments made of brick and dimension stone, a frame with simple steel girders and a (still) partially wooden bridge deck. The frame and balance are made of riveted steel with half-timbering. The lifting cables are also made of steel. The movement work is performed in a quadrant. In contrast to many steel bridges, the balustrades are made of decorative ironwork.

== History ==
The bridge was made by Werkspoor op Oostenburg. In 1911, the controls were given electric power with a drive from the NB Haarlemsche Machinefabriek v / h / Gebr. Figee. Some repair work had to be done in 1936, but the bridge has done its job perfectly since its placement. However, today the bridge is controlled in the same way as the adjacent bridge 327, which resulted in a saving on the lubrication frequency from 10 times a month to once every quarter.

According to Smit van Wichert, the designer was Arend de Graaf and belongs to his first generation of drawbridges. Very few of them are left because they became outdated and looked somewhat crude. In the years following the construction of this bridge, De Graaf's drawbridges became somewhat more ornate, so the movement work became open (it is closed at bridge 80). It was not until 1915 that the definitive De Graaf drawbridge took its shape under the influence of structural engineer Adriaan Dwars. The end result of all improvements can be found in bridge 307, the result of a collaboration with Piet Kramer.

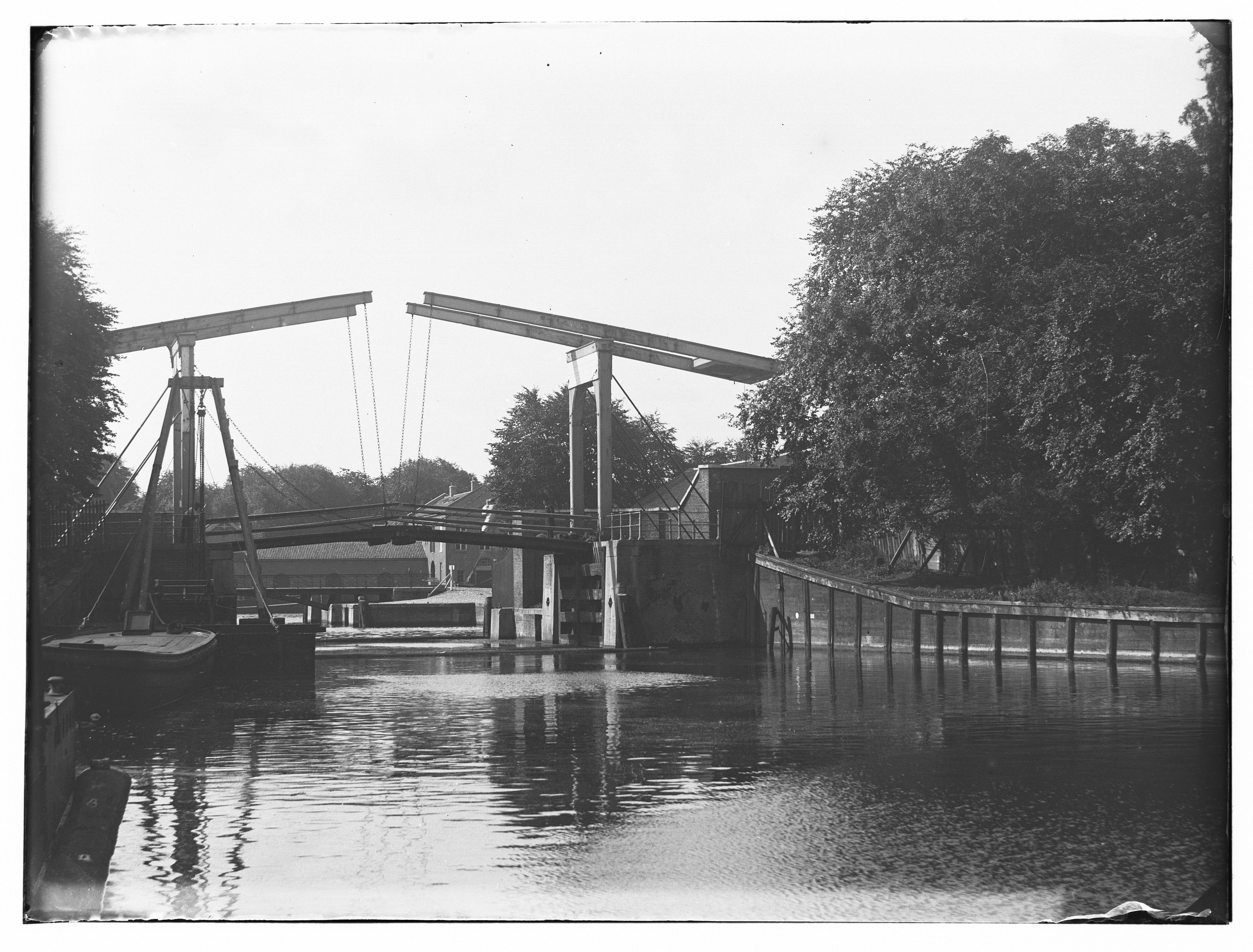
Double wooden drawbridge established by Jacob Olie in 1891

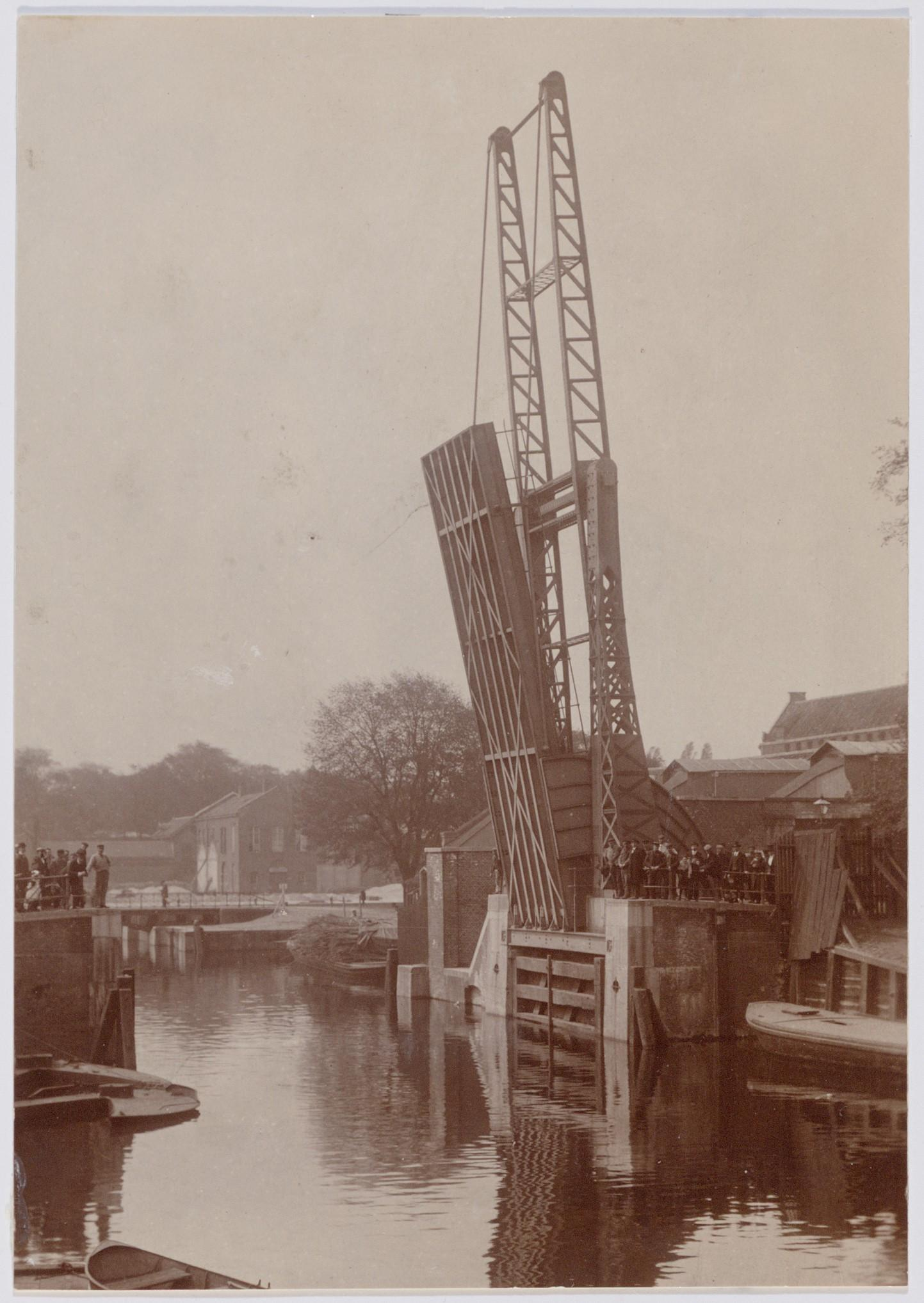
Daylight print made by industrial photographer Gustaaf Oosterhuis (1858-1938) of the drawbridge in the Hoogte Kadijk, ca 1902

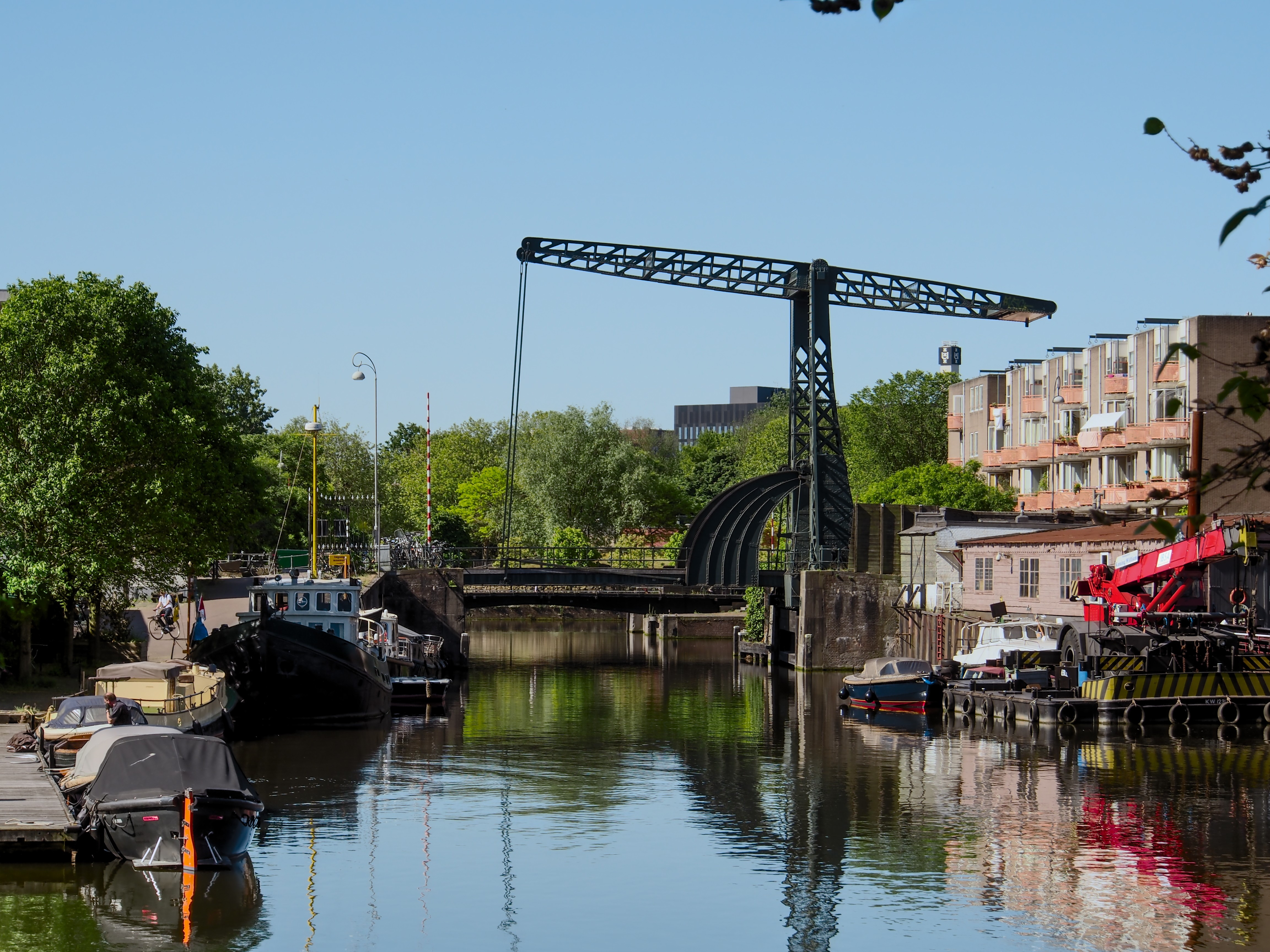
The bridge in May 2017

== See also ==
- Canals of Amsterdam

== Sources ==
- Bruggen van Amsterdam
- Frank V. Smit, Bruggen in Amsterdam, Matrijs 2008
- Monumentenregister, geraadpleegd 12 augustus 2017
