= Dijksgracht =

Canal in Amsterdam

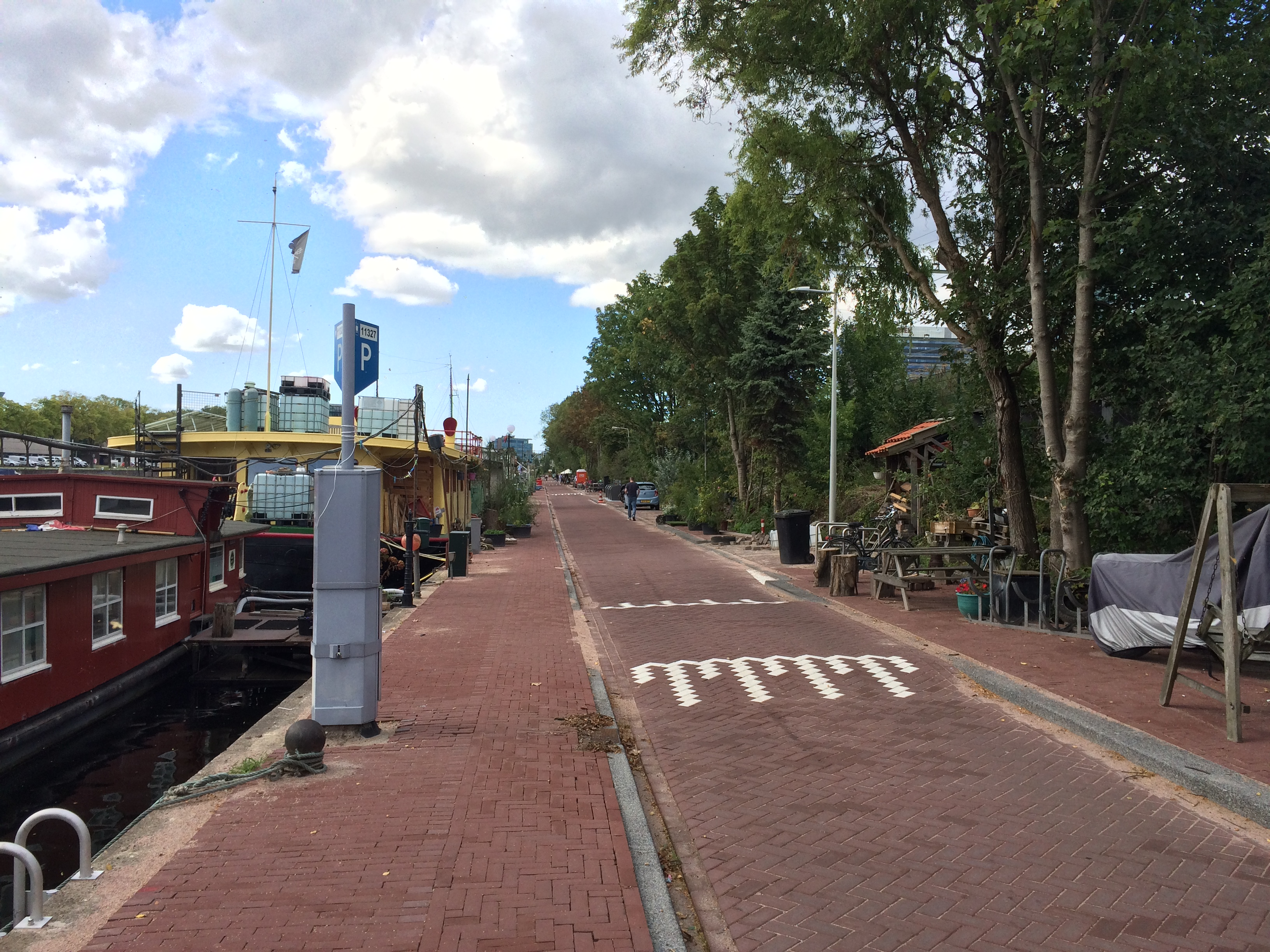
- Middle section of the Dijksgracht street (2017)

- Location within Amsterdam
- Addresses: Oostelijke Eilanden
- Location: Amsterdam
- Postal code: 1019 BS / BT
- Coordinates: 52.376111°N 4.917222°E
- West end: Oosterdok
- To: Oostenburg Island

Construction
- Inauguration: 1957

The Dijksgracht (Dutch pronunciation: [ˈdɛiksˌxrɑxt]; Dike Canal) is a canal in the center of Amsterdam, north of the three Oostelijke Eilanden (Eastern Islands). It is also the name of the adjacent street.

== Location ==
The Dijksgracht was named for the dyke that cut off the Oosterdok from the IJ, and is just south of this dyke. The west end of the Dijksgracht street starts from Oosterdokskade (street) on Oosterdokseiland. The Oosterdoksdraaibrug (bridge) takes it across the Oosterdoksdoorgang (channel) and the street runs east along the south of the dike to Kattenburgerstraat. The canal continues further east, under the Mariniersbrug (bridge) to the Wittenburgervaart, but there is not yet a public road along this part. Yet further east on Oostenburg island there is another segment of street called Dijksgracht, between the VOC quay and Conradstraat, but without addresses.

== History and location ==
The dike, after which the canal and street are named, was created at the end of the 19th century as protection for the Oostelijke Eilanden (Eastern Islands) against silting up from the IJ. The railway line from Amsterdam Centraal station to Utrecht and Hilversum is located on the dike body itself. The Piet Heinkade dual carriageway is on the other side of the railway embankment.

There are several houseboats in the water. One of the most famous residents of Dijksgracht was singer Ramses Shaffy, who lived in one of these houseboats in the 1970s. In 2008, in the context of his 75th birthday, a tree was named after him.

The beginning of the Dijksgracht, the so-called Kop Dijksgracht, contains a number of facilities including an indoor climbing wall, a restaurant, the Mediamatic cultural institution and the 'Shaffy's Garden' neighborhood vegetable garden.

== Planned development ==
Due to its central location, many plans have been made to renew Dijksgracht. A temporary slow traffic bridge has been constructed from Dijksgracht to the Marineterrein, which was opened to the public in 2015. The bridge was opened in January 2016 and was later named Commandants Bridge. The span is part of a connection between Central Station and the Marineterrein.

In 2007 there were plans to extend the Dijksgracht as a cycle and footpath east of the Mariniersbrug but that was postponed. In 2015, the plan was discussed again, Dijksgracht-west would be given a make-up and Dijksgracht-east would be provided with a cycle path as far as Oostenburgereiland. There was much opposition from the residents, mainly because of the disappearance of a lot of greenery. After various consultation rounds, the green and informal character of the street was preserved.

The paving of the Dijksgracht was renewed in 2017, while a new sewer and gas pipeline for the houseboats were installed. To prevent subsidence of the road surface, drainage and a retaining wall were undertaken. The cycle route from Dijksgracht-west will be extended in 2019 to the former Stork site on Oosterburgereiland.

== Afbeeldingen ==
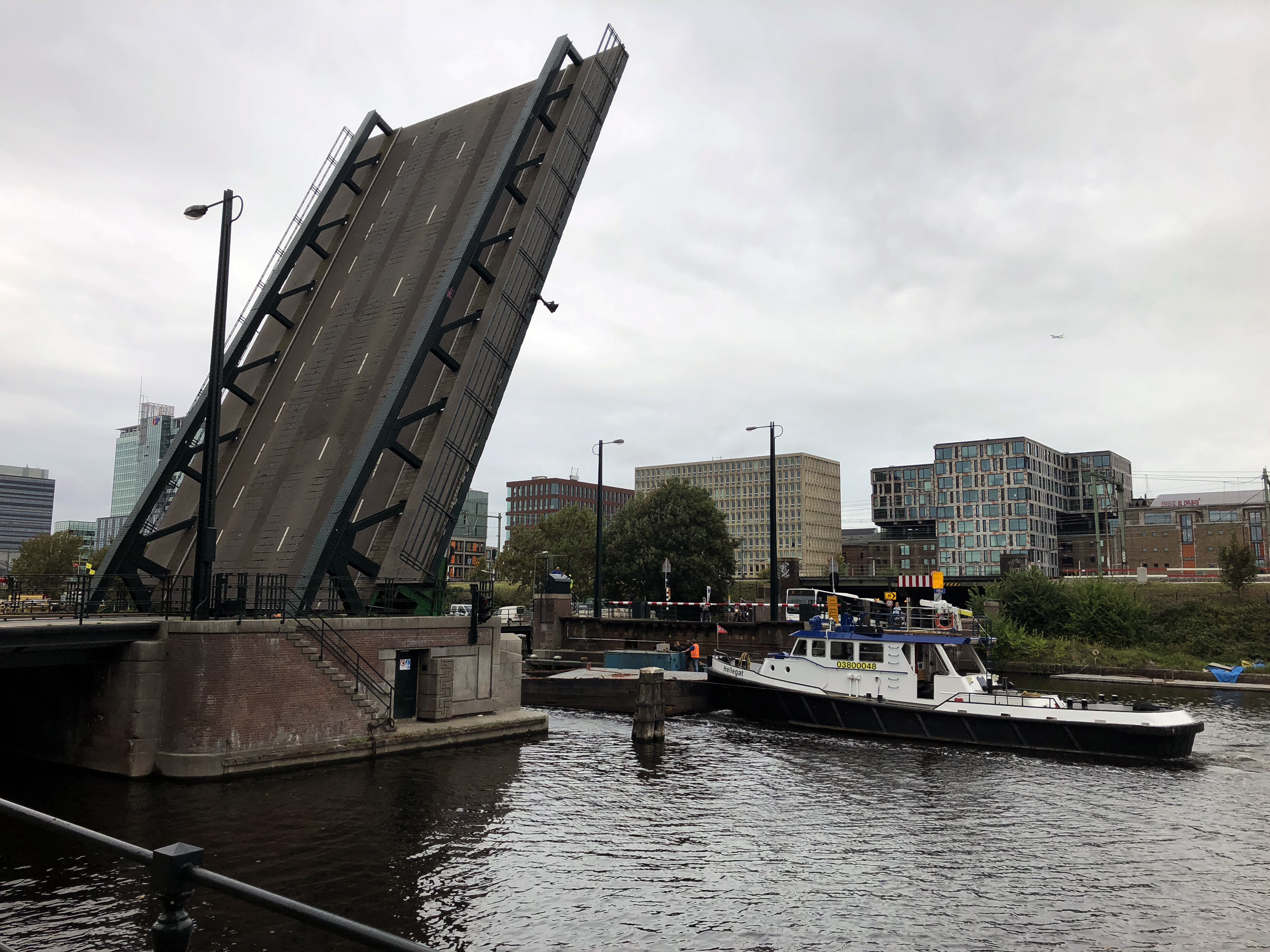
The Mariniersbrug over the Dijksgracht

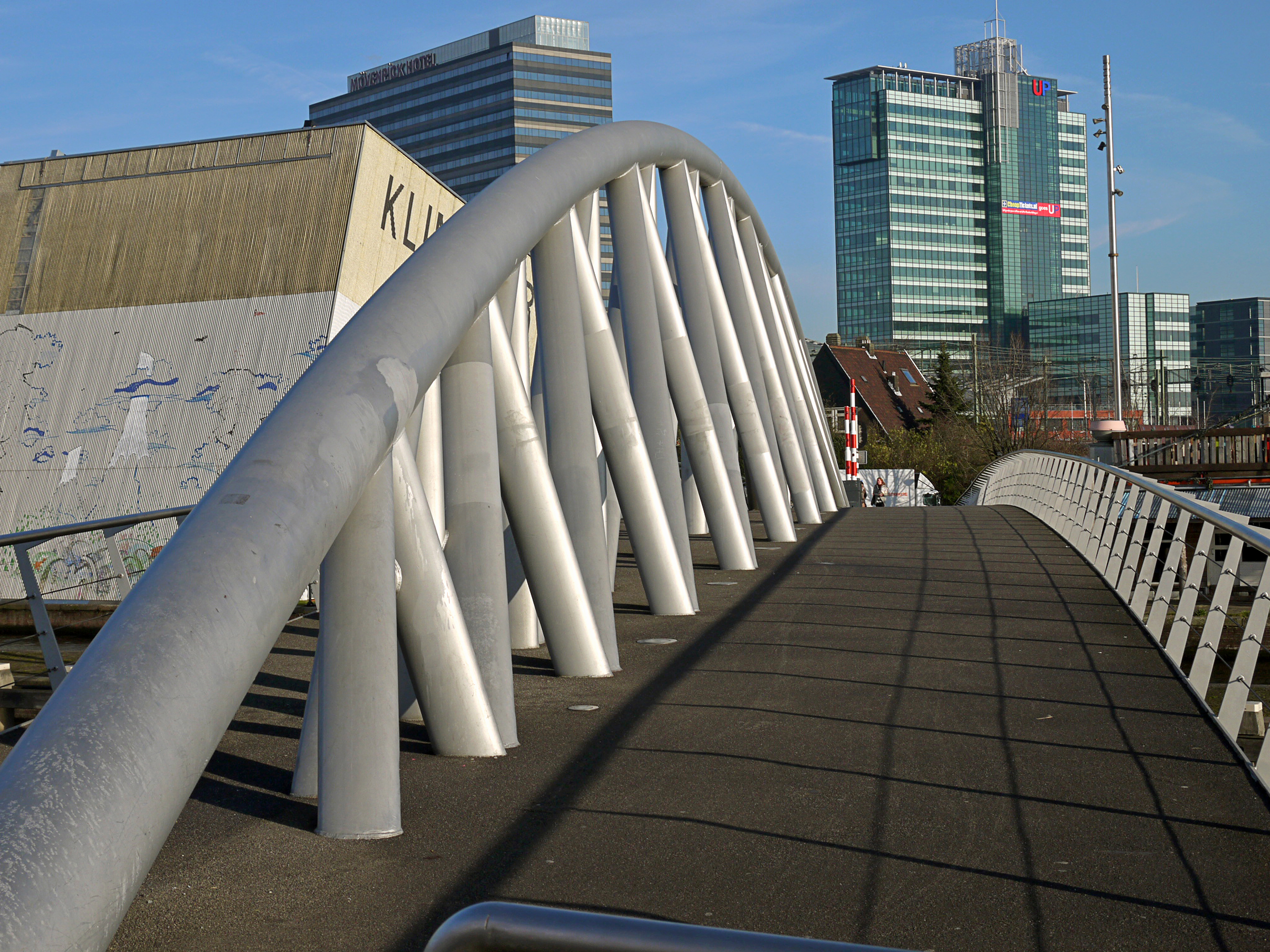
Oosterdoksdraaibrug, with the climbing hall on the left.

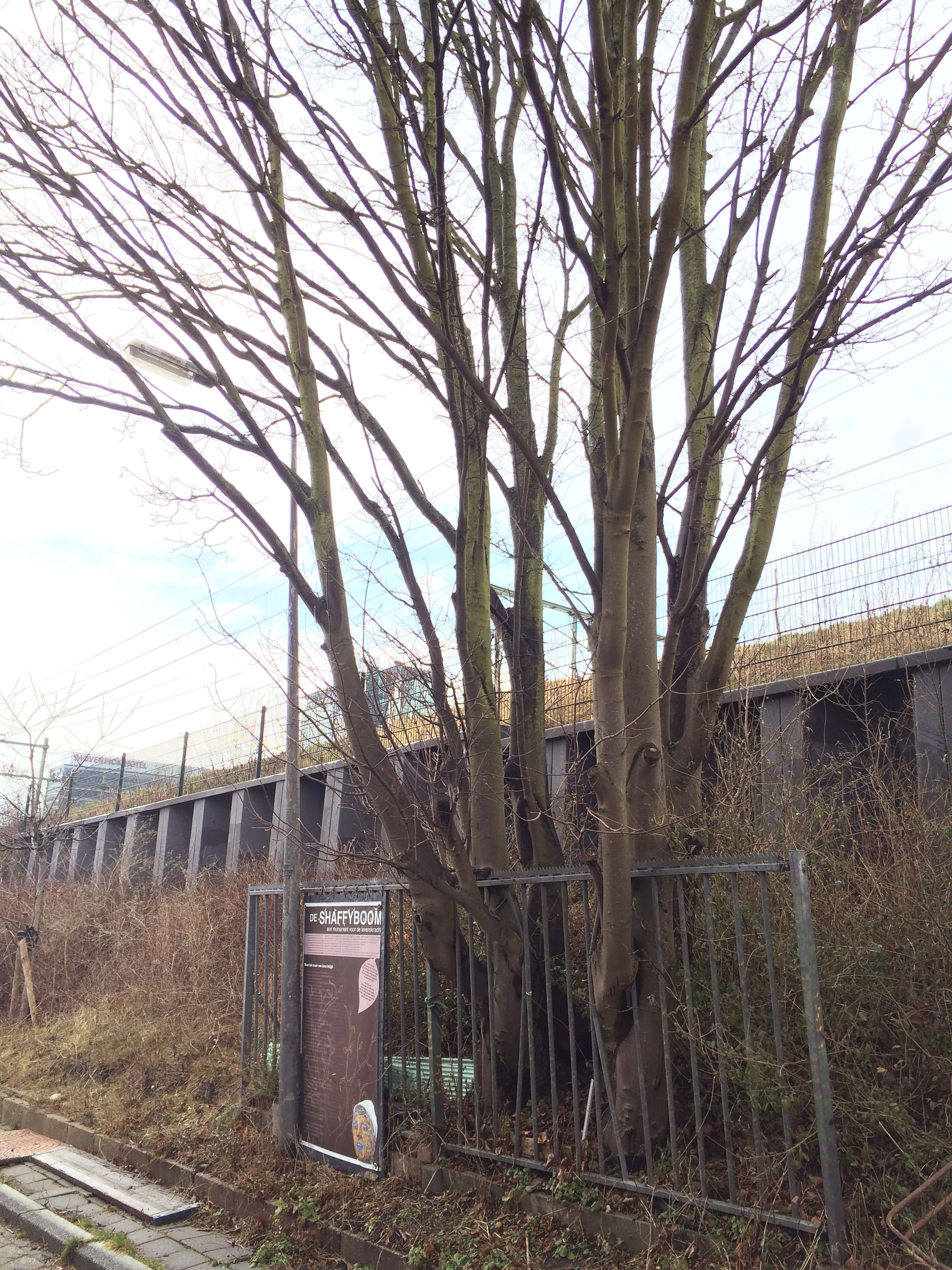
Shaffy tree

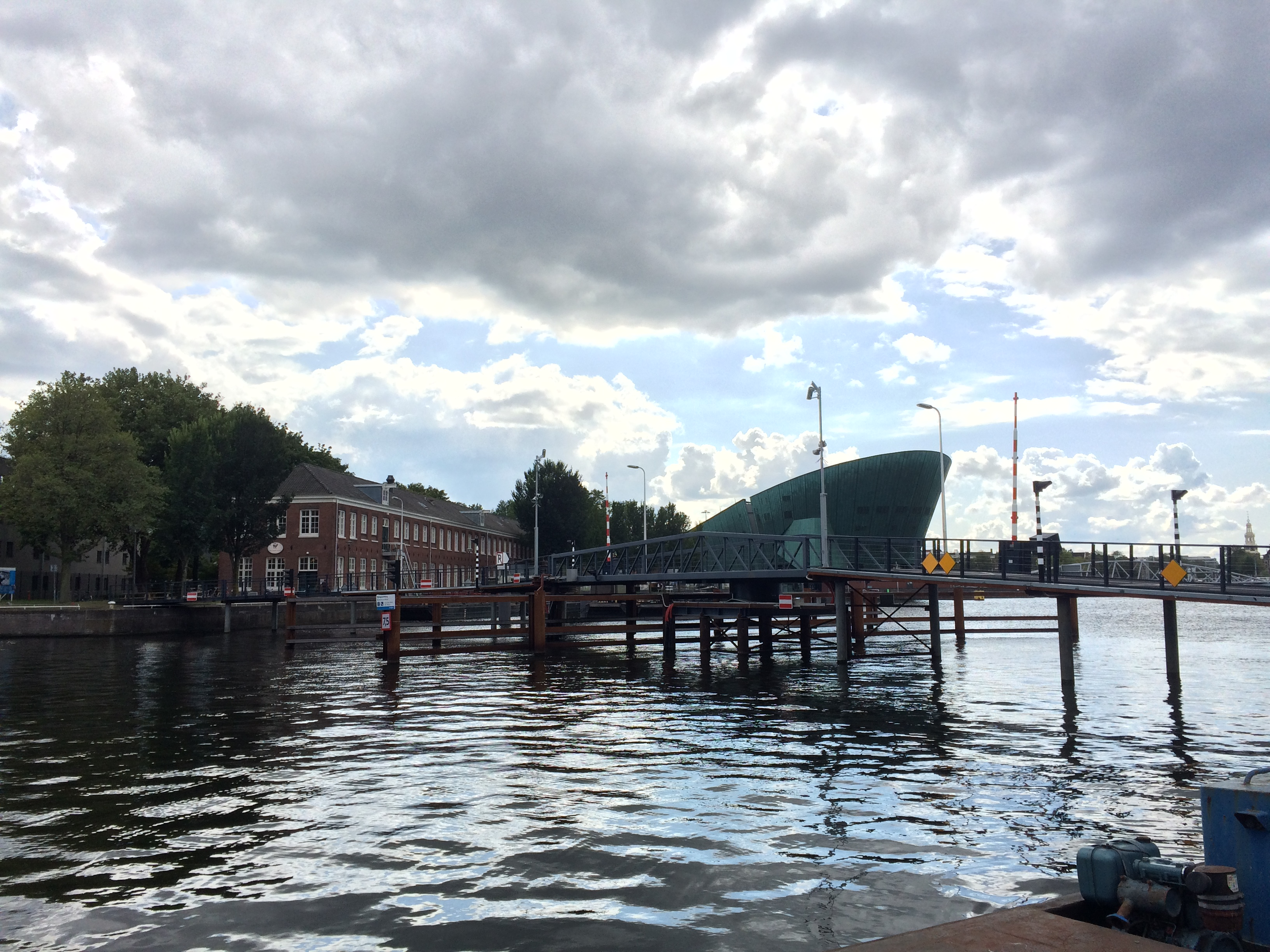
Temporary bridge that connects the Dijksgracht with the Marineterrein

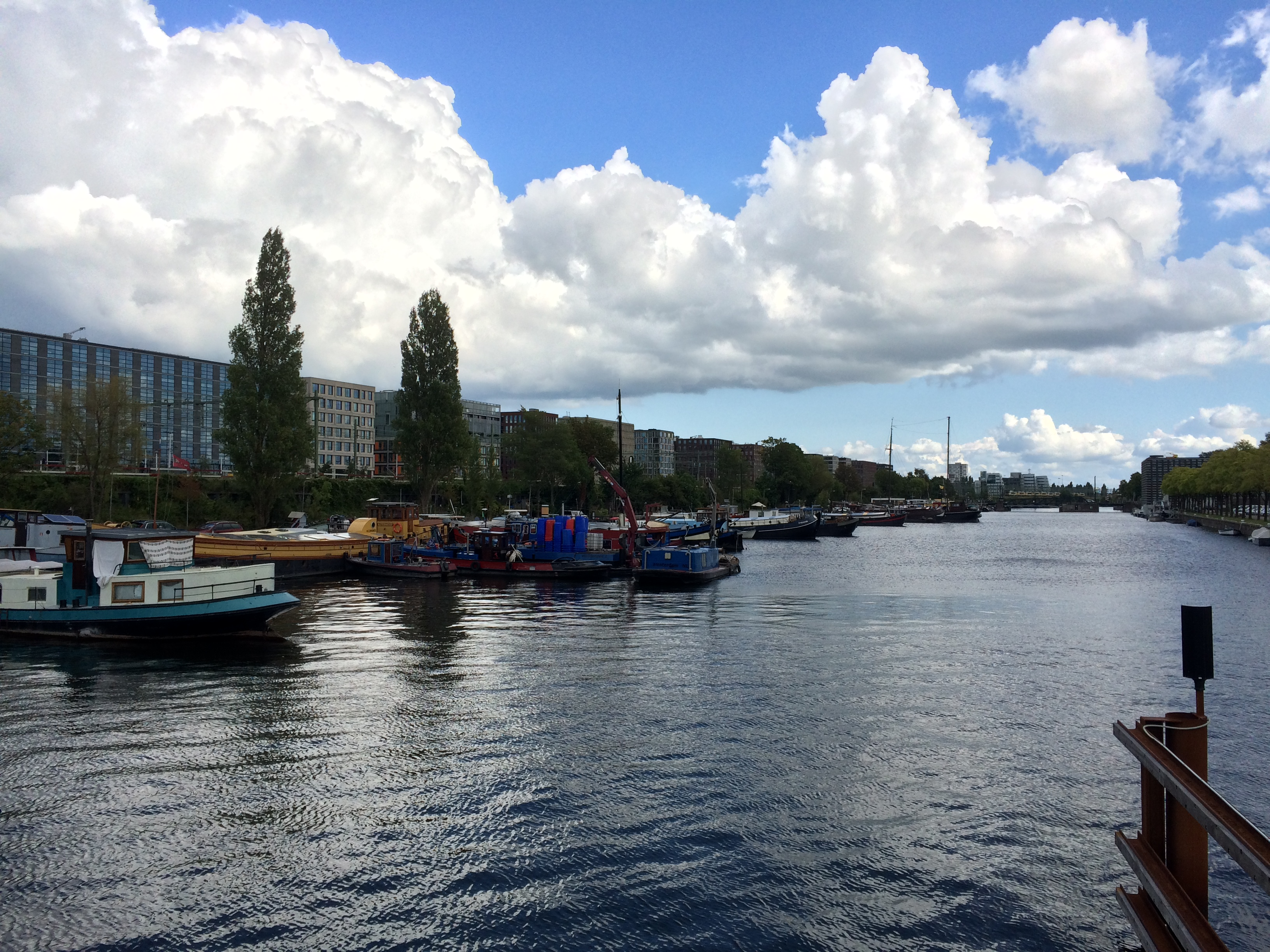
Dijksgracht seen from the Commandantsbrug

== See also ==
- Canals of Amsterdam
