= Oostelijke Eilanden =

Coordinates: 52°22′09″N 4°55′22″E

- Neighbourhood
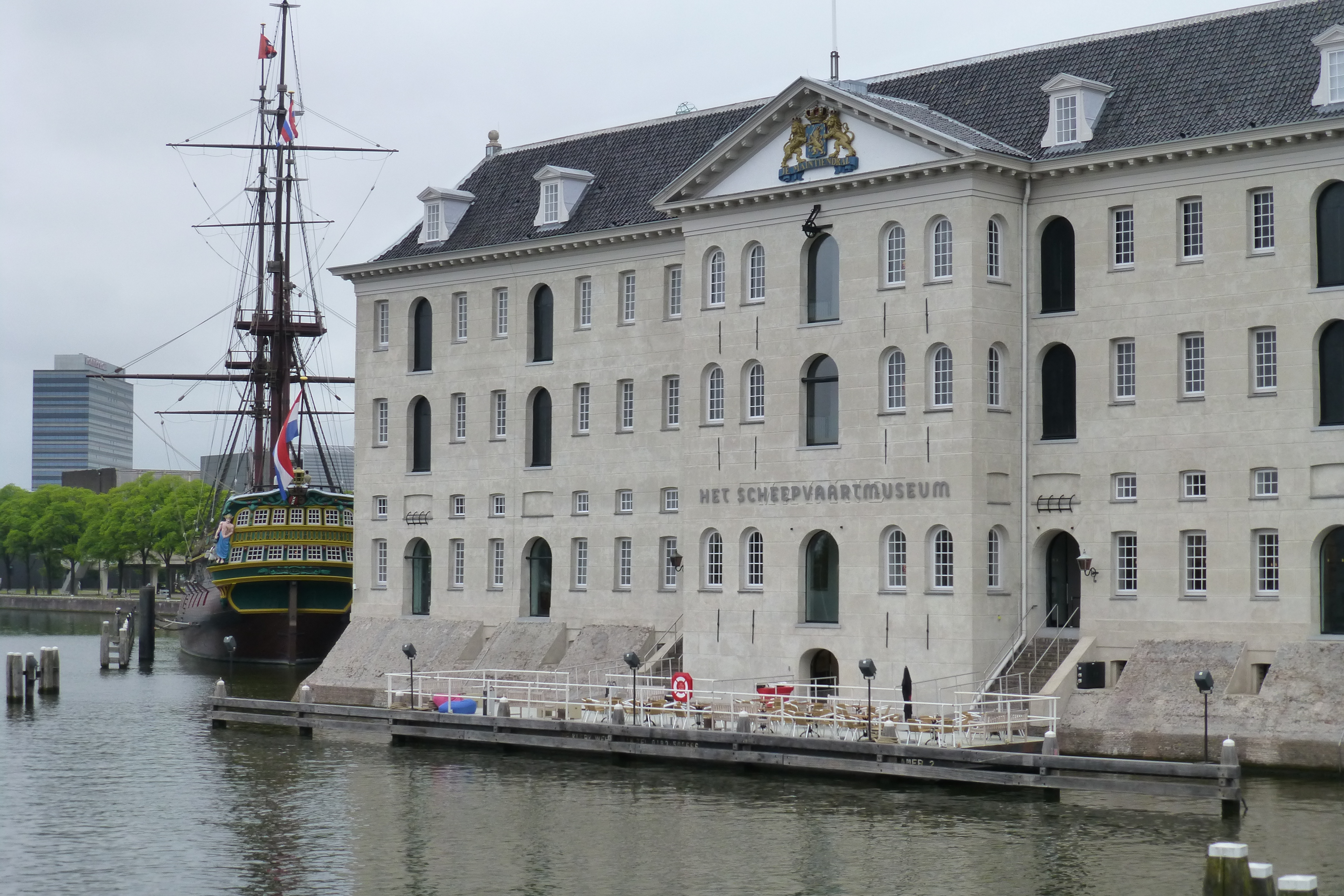
- Het Scheepvaartmuseum

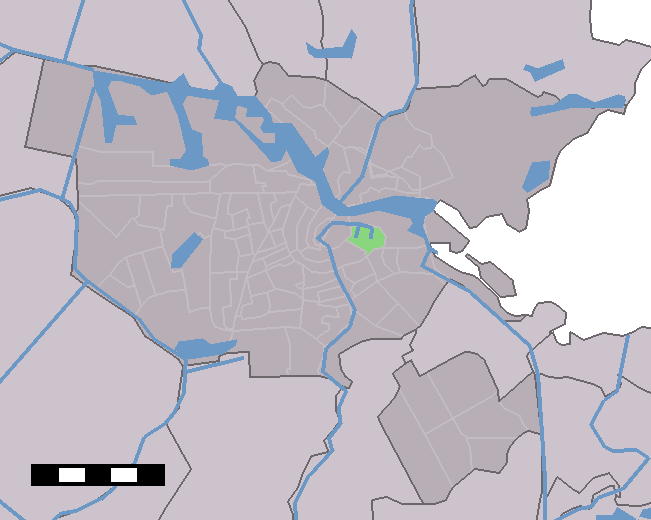
- Location of Oostelijke Eilanden in Amsterdam
- Country: Netherlands
- Province: North Holland
- COROP: Amsterdam
- Borough: Centrum
- Time zone: UTC+1 (CET)

Oostelijke Eilanden (Dutch pronunciation: [ˌoːstələkə ˈʔɛilɑndə(n)]; lit. Eastern Islands), also known as Oostelijke Eilanden en Kadijken (Eastern Islands and Quays), is a neighbourhood in the centre of Amsterdam, Netherlands, consisting of Kattenburg, Wittenburg and Oostenburg.

== Geography ==
The islands are bounded to the south by the Nieuwe Vaart and to the north by the Dijksgracht. They are separated by the Kattenburgervaart between Kattenburg and Wittenburg, as well as by the Wittenburgervaart between Wittenburg and Oostenburg. Oostenburg contains what remains of the Oostenburgervaart. Notable buildings include the Oosterkerk and 's Lands Zeemagazijn (Het Scheepvaartmuseum), as well as the INIT Building, which houses de Volkskrant, Trouw and Het Parool.

== See also ==
- Czaar Peterbuurt

== Sources ==
- Een Roerig Volkje. De geschiedenis van de Oostelijke Eilanden, Kadijken en Czaar Peterbuurt. Door Ton Heijdra, Uitgeverij René de Milliano, Alkmaar 1999. ISBN 90-72810-24-4.
- De Plantage, Kadijken, en Oostelijke Eilanden. Een buurt in beeld. Amsterdam publishers, 1999.
- Tot ziens op Kattenburg! De wederopbouw van de oostelijke eilanden 1960-1980. Door Ine Vermaas. Uitgave Wijkcentrum Oostelijke Binnenstad. Amsterdam, 2006.
