= Nieuwe Vaart =

Canal in Amsterdam

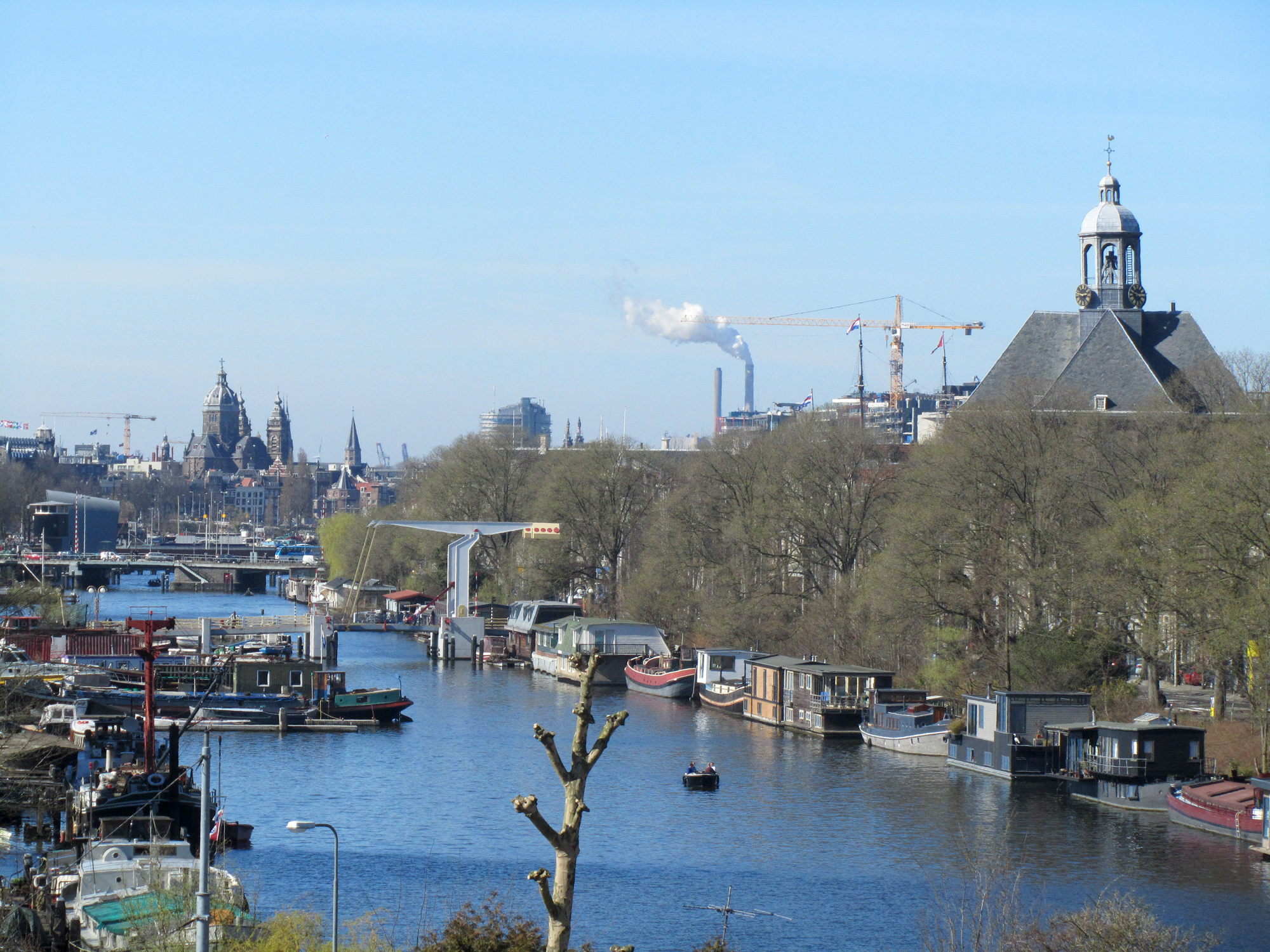
- The Nieuwe Vaart, looking in a north-westerly direction. The Oosterkerk is on the right. The bridge in the middle is the Overhaalsgang. The Kattenburger Bridge can also be seen in the background.

- Location within Amsterdam
- Location: Amsterdam
- Coordinates: 52.367222°N 4.925°E

The Nieuwe Vaart or Nieuwevaart is a 17th-century canal in Amsterdam that runs from the center to Amsterdam-Oost (Amsterdam East).

Kromhout Museum is located on the Nieuwe Vaart. On this site, the Westkap is still used as a shipyard, but the Oosthal is furnished as a museum. The Oosterkerk is also on the Nieuwe Vaart.

== Description ==
From the Kattenburgerplein, in front of the Maritime Museum, the canal runs in a southeastern direction between the Oostelijke Eilanden (Eastern Islands) on the north side and the Kadijken on the south side. Along this section of the canal, the waterway is met from the north by the Kattenburgervaart and Wittenburgervaart via culverts, and from the south by the Entrepotdok via the Entrepotdoksluis. Just west of the Entrepotdoksluis is floodgate (Nieuwe Vaartbemaling) which can be closed to block high water from the IJ. At the Dageraadsbrug, the Nieuwe Vaart has a short connection with the Lozingskanaal (a extension of the Singelgracht) and continues eastwards along the Cruquiskade and the Zeeburgerpad before reaching the Zeeburgersluis, which provides access to the Amsterdam–Rhine Canal. This eastern part of the Nieuwe Vaart runs parallel to the Lozingskanaal and forms the southern boundary of the Eastern Docklands (Oostelijk Havengebied).

Along the western part of the canal, on the north side (on the Eastern Islands), a street changes name four times from northwest to southeast: Kattenburgerplein - Kattenburgergracht - Wittenburgergracht - Oostenburgergracht, which together they form the Eilandboulevard. A series of discontinuous streets including, Nieuwevaart and Kruithuisstraat, run along the south side. Nieuwevaart 5-9 is the headquarters of the municipal Transport and Transport Infrastructure Department.

=== Bridges ===
The western end of the Nieuwe Vaart is marked by the Kattenburgerbrug, which connects the Prins Hendrikkade with the Kattenburgerplein. Halfway along the western part of the canal is a pedestrian bridge called the Overhaalsgang. The Dageraadsbrug, part of a busy traffic square, carries Amsterdam Tram Line 7 across the canal. There are three bridges across the eastern part of the Nieuwe Vaart: Brug 1966, Slachthuisbrug and Ad Grimmonbrug. Just west of the Slachthuisbrug, a railway bridge for the Eastern Railway line between Amsterdam Centraal station and Amsterdam Muiderpoort railway station crosses the canal.

== History ==
The Nieuwe Vaart was created in the 17th century when the island of Kattenburg was built outside the dykes. The island crossed so much of the IJ that silting problems arose. The Nieuwe Vaart canal was dug in 1649 to ensure a good flow of water.

Originally there was only one bridge over the Nieuwe Vaart to the Eastern Islands. By lifting this Kattenburger bridge, the residents could shut themselves off from the outside world. This came in handy with the Bijltjesoproer, a riot in 1787 by Orangist ship carpenters in Kattenburg against the patriot city council.

The Nieuwe Vaart also played a role in the 1917 Potato riots. A barge with potatoes was sent via the Nieuwe Vaart to the Entrepotdok on 30 June. A group of women followed the barge and started throwing stones, at which mounted police started shooting in the air.

The western part of the Nieuwe Vaart has been used for shipbuilding and repair since the 17th century. With the arrival of steamships in the second half of the 19th century, more and more port activities were relocated there. The Nieuwe Vaart became the harbor basin for all large ships so that most yards made way for warehouses.

The Nieuwe Vaart Association was established in January 2011. This association represents the interests of the residents of houseboats in the western part of the Nieuwe Vaart. The association was founded by houseboat residents as a result of redevelopment plans by the Centrum district, where most of the berths for houseboats in the Nieuwe Vaart would disappear.

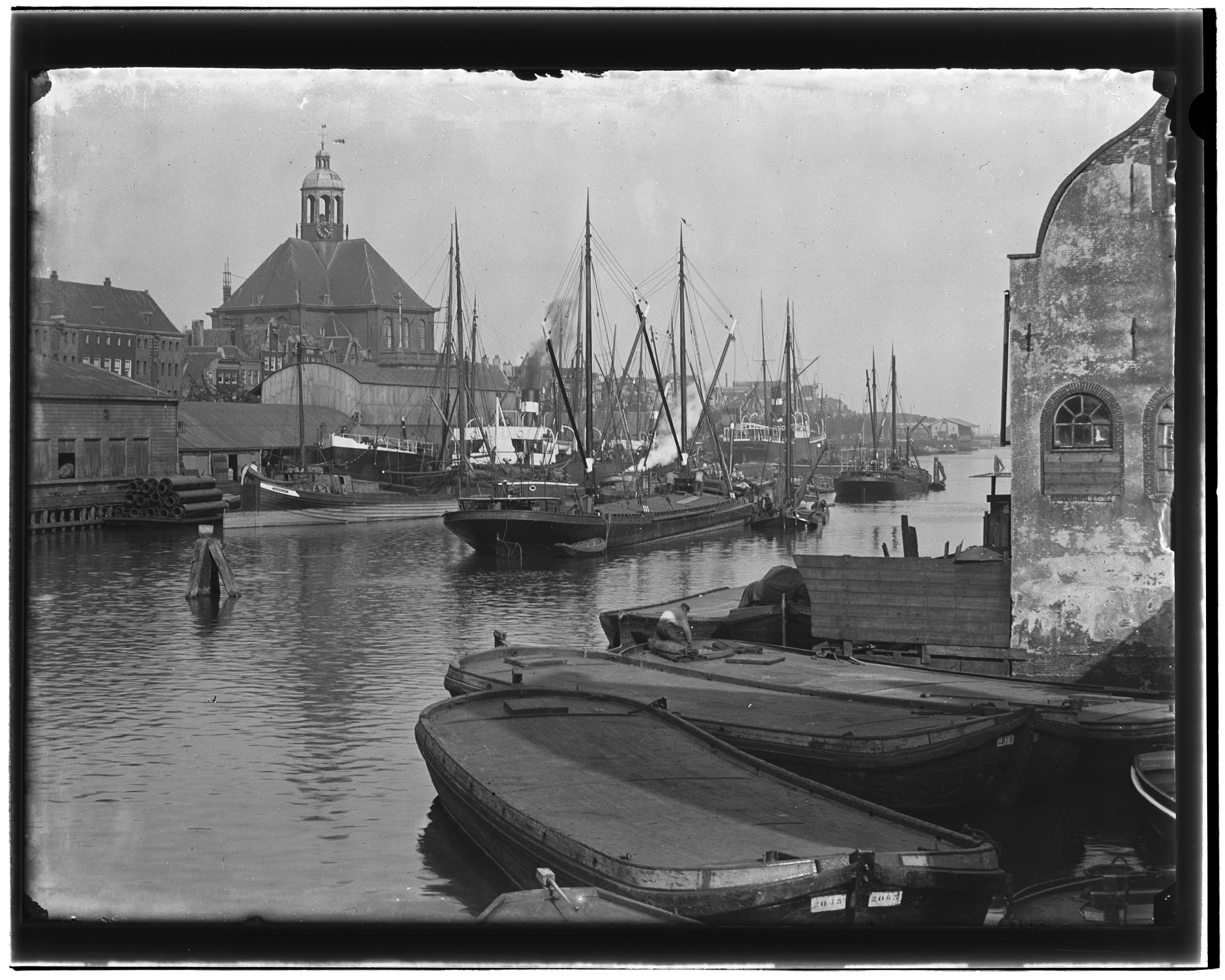
The canal in 1895

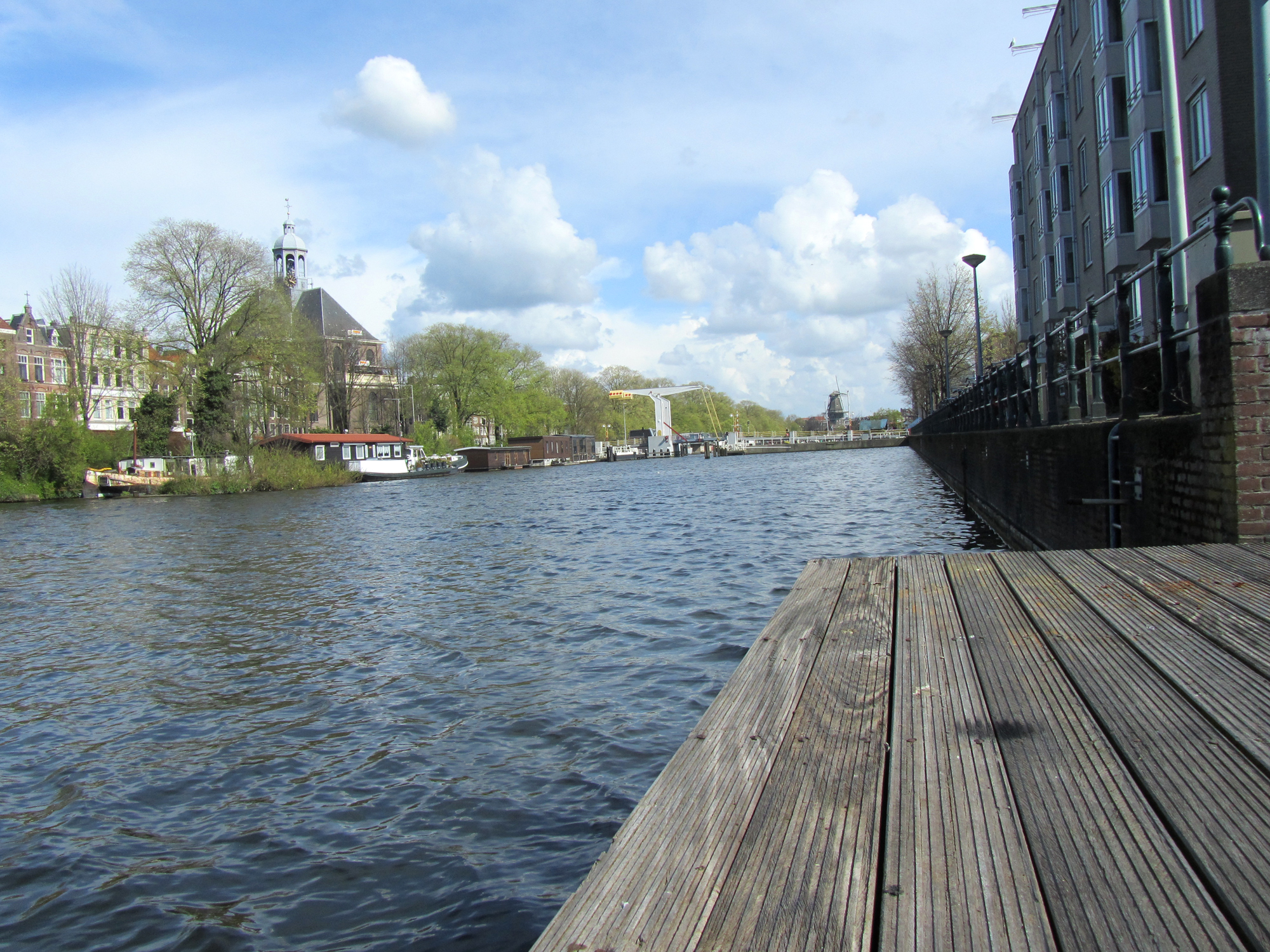
The Nieuwe Vaart, looking in a southeastern direction. On the left is the Oosterkerk. The De Gooyer windmill can be seen in the distance.

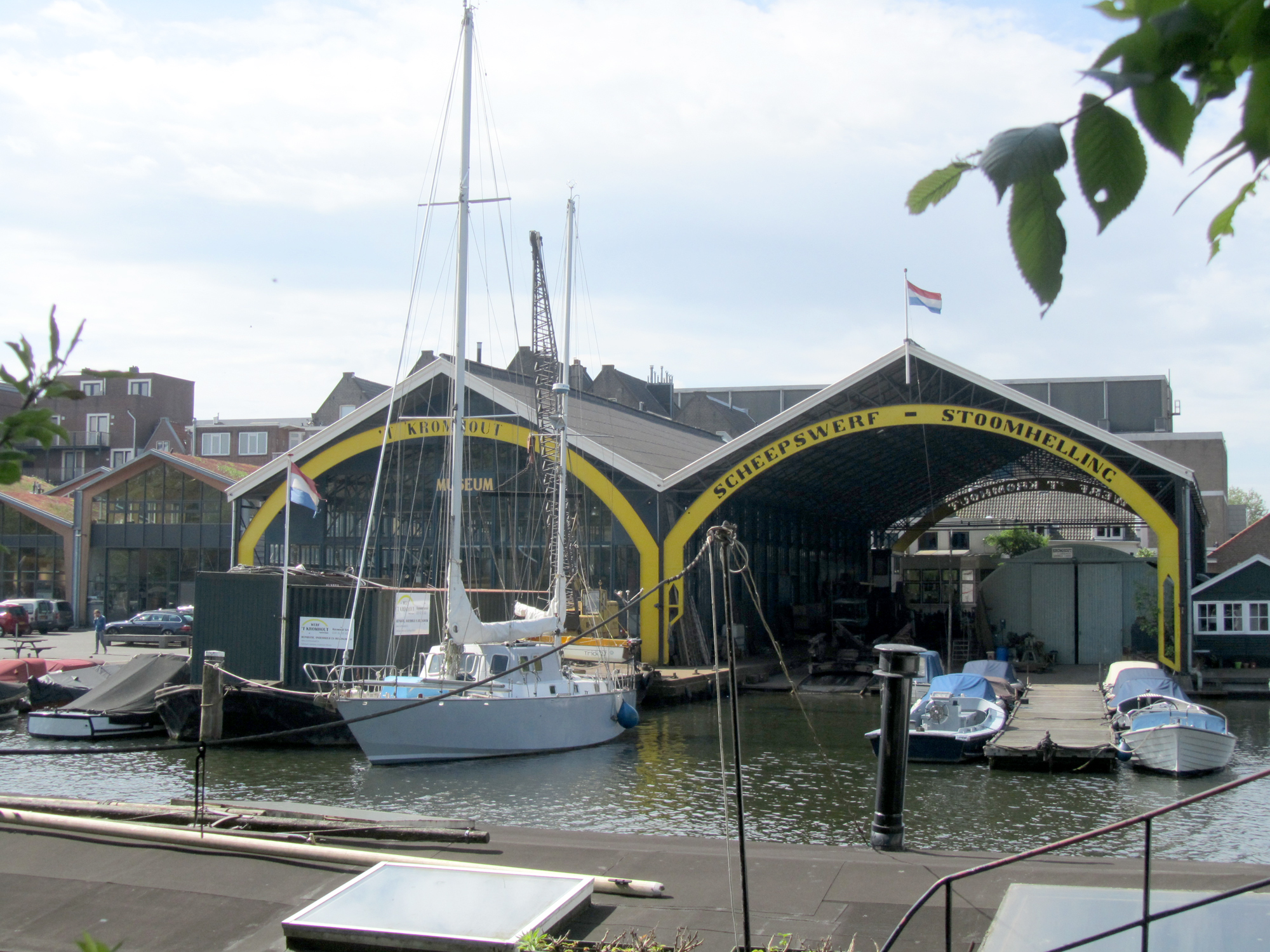
Shipyard museum 't Kromhout

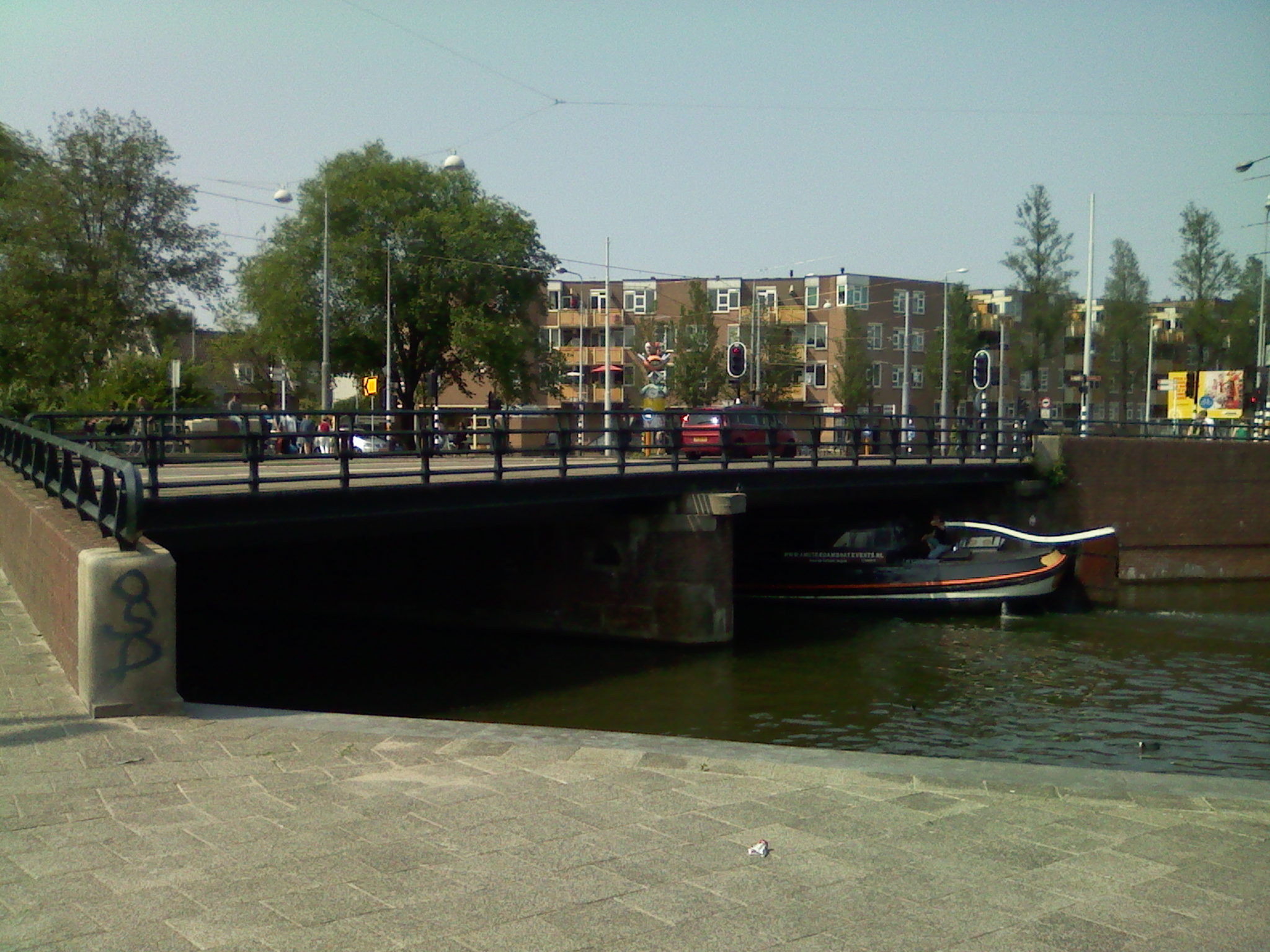
The Dageraadsbrug, where the canal starts to run parallel to the Singelgracht

== Buildings ==
The canal has a number of notable historical buildings on it. The Oostkerk, a former 17th-century brick church, which now serves as a concert hall for contemporary and classical music; the Kromhout shipyard museum, which dates back to the 18th century, and the Admiraliteitslijnbaan, a 17th-century building, which is now a convention centre, but originally served as the front building of the ropewalk of the Admiralty of Amsterdam and reputedly housed Peter the Great when he was studying shipbuilding in Amsterdam.

== See also ==
- Canals of Amsterdam
