= Koninklijke Paketvaart-Maatschappij =

Former shipping company based in the Dutch East Indies

NV Koninklijke Paketvaart-Maatschappij
- Company type: Naamloze vennootschap
- Industry: Passenger, mail and cargo shipping within the Dutch East Indies, and to and from neighbouring countries
- Founded: 1888
- Founder: Rotterdamsche Lloyd; Stoomvaart Maatschappij Nederland
- Defunct: 1966
- Fate: Merged
- Successors: Nedlloyd (1970–1997); P&O Nedlloyd (1997–2006); Maersk Line (2006–present)
- Headquarters: Amsterdam, Netherlands
- Parent: Nederlandsche Scheepvaart Unie
- Website: http://kunstbezitnedlloyd.org

Koninklijke Paketvaart-Maatschappij (KPM, Dutch for Royal Packet Navigation Company), was a Dutch shipping line in the Dutch East Indies, now Indonesia. It traded from 1888 to 1966. It was the dominant inter-island shipping line in the Dutch East Indies in the last half-century of the colonial era.

== Foundation ==
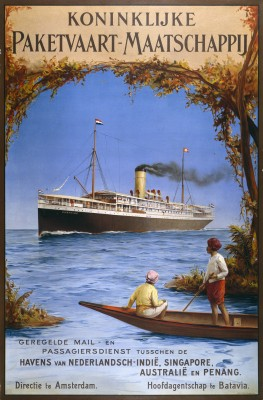
A KPM advertisement in 1910

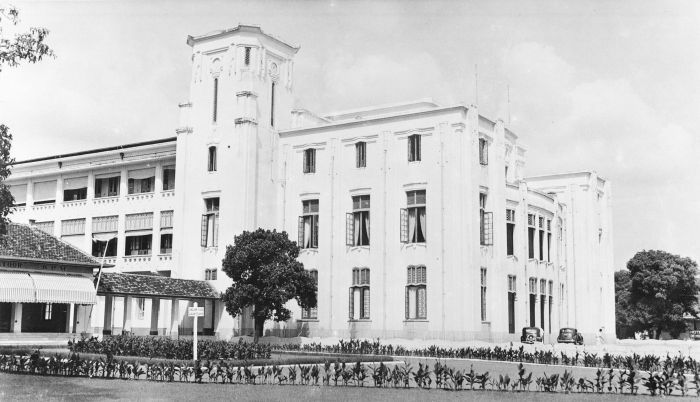
The headquarters of the KPM in Koningsplein, Batavia. The building is now the headquarters of the Indonesian Ministry of Transportation.

In 1863 the British-owned Nederlandsch-Indische Stoomvaartmaatschappij (NISM) won a tender for a number of subsidized shipping lines in the Dutch East Indies. As a consequence the inter-island shipping lines became centered on Singapore. Further, all but two of the many ships required were built in the United Kingdom. The minister of colonial affairs Jacobus Sprenger van Eyk and the businessmen Jan Boissevain (1836–1904), Willem Ruys, and PE Tegelberg responded with a plan for a new "national" shipping line.

On 19 March 1888 a law was made to govern the relations between the (Dutch East Indies) government and the new public company, Koninklijke Paketvaart Maatschappij. KPM had to hold office in the Netherlands or Dutch East Indies; appointments of executives and representatives had to be approved by the government; a government representative would have access to the administration and meetings of the company; half of the required ships must be built in the Netherlands; the company could use only Dutch commanders, navigators and engineers; and the Dutch government would subsidise the company to operate the lines.

The establishment of the KPM did indeed have the desired effects. The KPM supported the unification of the Dutch colonial economy as the Netherlands expanded its territory across the Indonesian archipelago. It brought inter-island commerce back from Singapore to the capital, Batavia (now Jakarta), which shifted economic activity to Java, and supplied more cargo for the shipping lines between Batavia and the Netherlands. Transport on this route was provided by the Stoomvaart Maatschappij Nederland (executives Jan Boissevain and PE Tegelberg) and Rotterdamsche Lloyd (executive Willem Ruys).

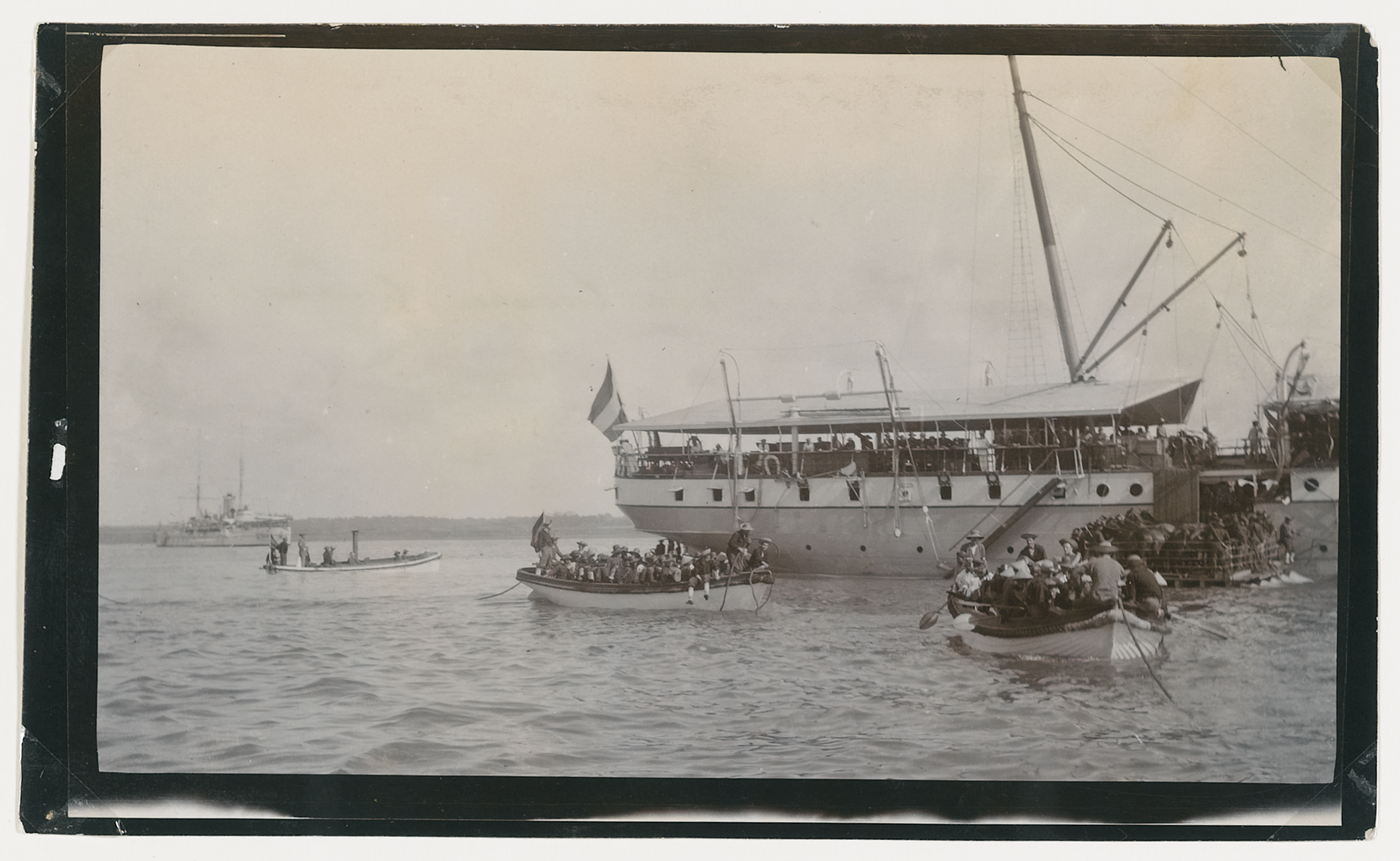
Disembarkation, presumably from the steamship Both of the Royal Paketvaart Maatschappij, of troops at Sanoer near Denpasar in the seventh Bali expedition, directed against the monarch.

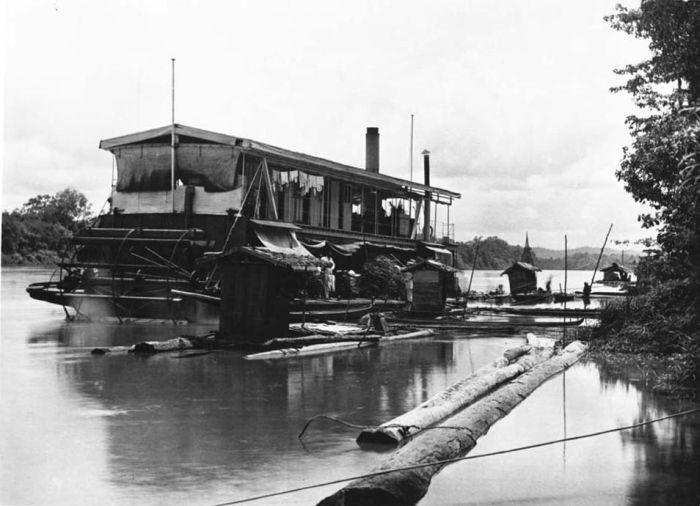
Paddle steamer Negara on the Barito River

== First ships ==
The foundation of the KPM also had a significant effect on the Dutch shipbuilding industry. The KPM ordered all its ships from the Netherlands. Especially in the early 1890s, this allowed Dutch shipyards to gain experience in building faster ships and to catch up with the foreign competition. In a few years the KPM ordered Both, Reael, Maetsuijcker and Coen at De Schelde Van Diemen and Carpentier at Fijenoord, Reijnst, Van Goens and Speelman at the Koninklijke Fabriek van Stoom- en andere Werktuigen, Reijniersz and Zwaardecroon at Maatschappij De Maas in Rotterdam, Van Riebeeck at J&K Smit in Slikkerveer and Camphuys at Huijgens and van Gelder in Amsterdam.

== Routes ==
The line's routes, beyond the home islands, included services to the ports of Singapore and Hong Kong, Shanghai, Manila, Saigon; the Australian ports of Brisbane, Sydney, Melbourne and Adelaide; African ports such as Durban, East London, Port Elizabeth, Mossel Bay, Cape Town, Zanzibar, Mombasa, and the Indian Ocean ports of Réunion and Mauritius and Mahé.

== First World War ==
The Netherlands were neutral in the First World War. However, in March 1918 the UK seized under angary numerous Dutch ships in ports of the British Isles and the British Empire. They included the KPM ships Pijnacker Hordijk, Rochussen, 's Jacob, Tasman, Van Heemskerk, and Van Waerwijck. In September 1918 U-46 sank Tasman by torpedo in the North Atlantic, killing 14 of her crew. The UK returned the remaining ships to KPM in 1919.

== Between the wars ==
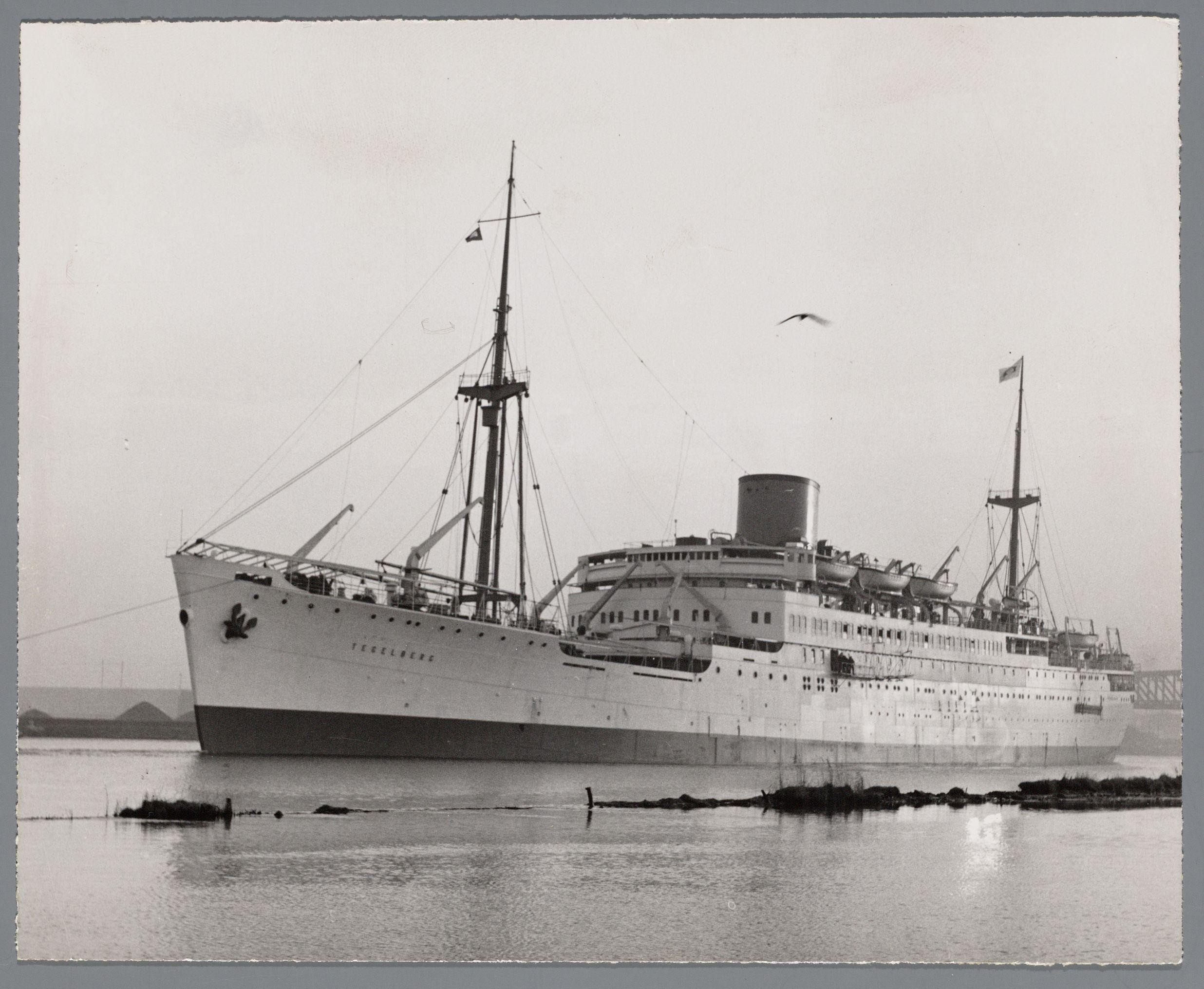
The motor ship Ruys early in 1938, around the time when she was completed

Until the 1920s, every KPM ship was smaller than 5,000 GRT, and they were built for economy, not speed. Between the two World Wars, KPM continued to concentrate on small ships, but added a small number of larger ships for some of its major routes. A pair of twin-screw turbine ships, Nieuw Holland and Nieuw Zeeland, were launched in 1927 and completed in 1928. Each was about 11,000 GRT and had a speed of 15 knots (28 km/h). Three triple-screw motor ships were launched in 1937, named Boissevain, Tegelberg and Ruys after KPM's founders. Each was about 14,000 GRT and had a speed of 17 knots (31 km/h).

To advance tourism in Indonesia, the company built a hotel on Bali in 1928, launching a tourist trade in the region.

== Second World War ==
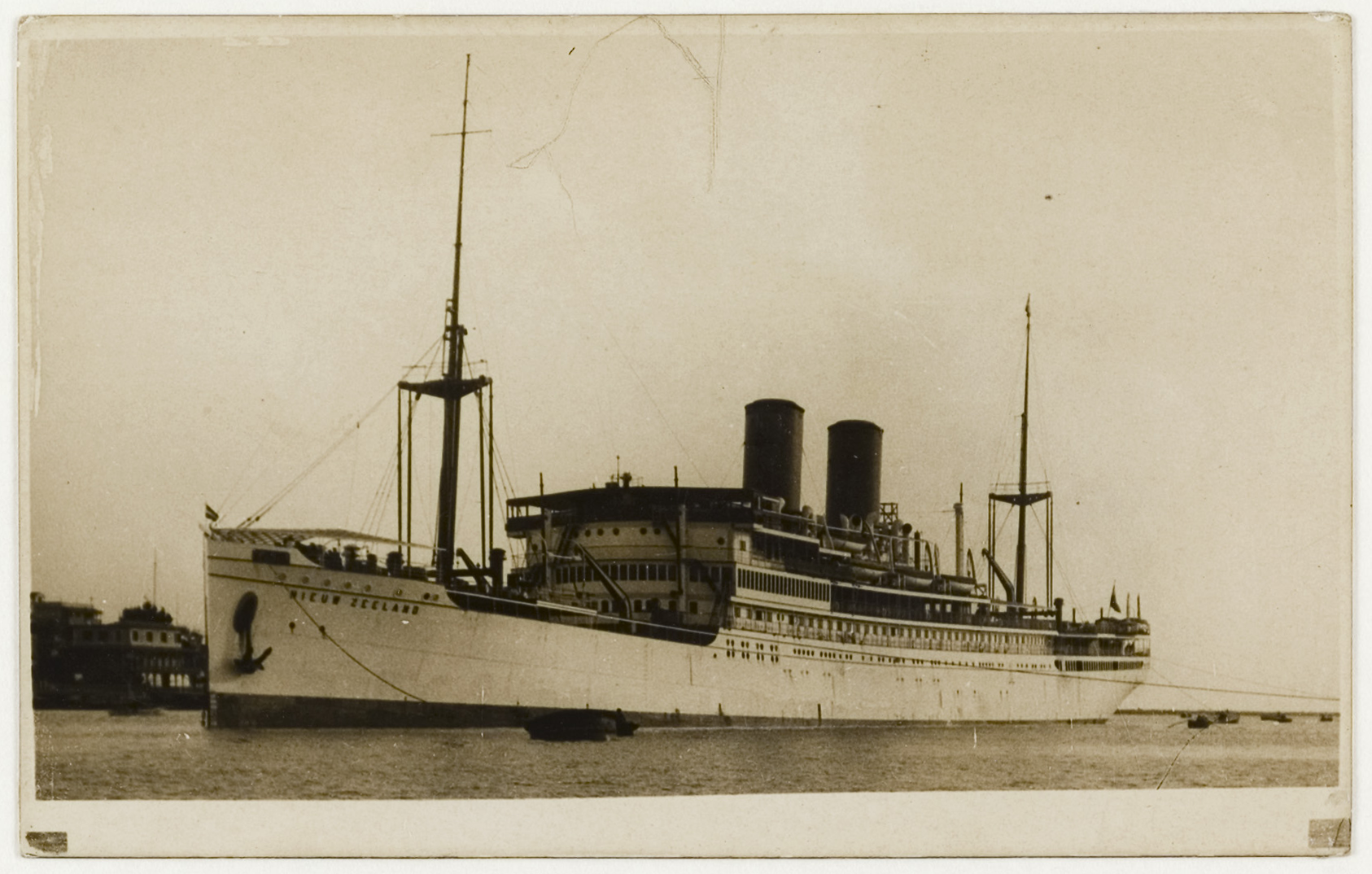
The turbine ship Nieuw Zeeland

In May 1940 Germany invaded the Netherlands. In August 1940 the UK Ministry of War Transport (MoWT) chartered Nieuw Zeeland and Nieuw Holland for conversion into troop ships.

Operating in and near the East Indies, KPM avoided war losses until February 1941, when Admiral Scheer shelled the cargo ship Rantaupandjang in the Indian Ocean, wounding four of her crew. Rantaupandjang surrendered, and a German boarding party scuttled her. Admiral Scheer interned Rantaupandjang's crew, two of whom died of wounds they sustained in the shelling.

In December 1941 Japan invaded the Dutch East Indies. KPM ships helped the Dutch, British and Australian warships to defend Singapore. In the Battle of the Java Sea, KPM ships carried ammunition. The Royal Netherlands Navy chartered several KPM ships to support the defense of the Netherlands East Indies and Singapore against the Japanese invasion.

KPM ships took part in the first months of war in the Pacific theatre, moving supplies and troops. In January 1942, RMS Aquitania was to take troops from Australia to Singapore, until concern about putting such a large and valued troopship, laden with 3,456 troops, in range of Japanese air strikes, led to a change of plan. Aquitania, escorted by the cruiser HMAS Canberra, left Sydney on 10 January, and arrived at Ratai Bay in the Sunda Strait on 20 January. There her troops were distributed among the KPM ships Both, Reael, Reijnst, Sloet van de Beele, Van der Lijn, and Van Swoll, and the UK-registered ship Taishan. The convoy reached Singapore on 24 January.

In March 1942 Japan overran Java, which all but completed its conquest of the Dutch East Indies. 21 KPM ships, laden with refugees, reached Australian ports. The ships were incorporated into a fleet being assembled by United States Forces in Australia (USFIA), which was soon redesignated as US Army Forces in Australia (USAFIA) and later the US Army Services of Supply (USASOS), to support the defense of Australia and campaign against the Japanese in the South West Pacific Area (SWPA). Twenty-one KPM ships were chartered in early 1942 for US Army use and became known as the "KPM vessels" in the SWPA fleet. The means by which these vessels were brought under control of the SWPA command was complex and involved discussions with the Dutch government-in-exile in both London and Washington, as well as in Australia. At first the twenty-one ships that reached Australia were chartered by the Chief Quartermaster, USAFIA, on 26 March 1942 with long term details to be negotiated at higher levels.

The eventual decision, involving governments in London, Washington and the Combined Chiefs of Staff, was that the charters would be handled by the British MoWT for the US Army. The complex arrangement was a "bareboat charter to MoWT and through the War Shipping Administration (WSA) the ships were assigned by WSA to the Army but 'not, repeat not, on bareboat but on gross basis,' though under 'full control' of the Army." In early March 1943 almost half the permanent local fleet comprised KPM vessels:

On 6 March 1943, nearly 16 months after the beginning of the war, the permanent local fleet consisted of 43 vessels: the 21 KPM vessels obtained on 26 March 1942 and the 6 additional KPM vessels obtained on 19 January 1943; 3 vessels from the China Navigation Co. Ltd. (Anhui, Hanyang, and Yochow); the Empire Hamble (formerly Thepsatri Nawa, previously Admiral Senn), of Siamese registry, assigned 15 October 1942; the Admiral Halstead, West Cactus (assigned 20 May 1942), and Portmar (salvaged and reconditioned in 1942 by port-battalion troops), of US registry; and 9 unnamed Liberty ships, which probably were in temporary service. Coast Farmer had been sunk on 21 July 1942, and Dona Nati had been withdrawn.

The 21 original ships were: Balikpapan (1938), Bantam (1930), Bontekoe (1922), Both (1931), Cremer (1926), Generaal Verspijck (1928), Janssens (1935), Japara (1930), Karsik (1938), Khoen Hoea (1924), (Note: Ship was built for Thong Ek Steamship Co. specifically designed for the Singapore/Pontianak (Borneo) trade and chartered to KPM sometime in 1940. Evacuated part of ABDA naval staff from Java to Australia. (Gill, 1957, p. 627)) Maetsuycker (1936), 's Jacob (1907), Sibigo (1926), Stagen (1919), Swartenhondt (1924), Tasman (1921), Van den Bosch (1903), Van der Lijn (1928), Van Heemskerk (1909), Van Heutsz (1926) and Van Spilbergen (1908).

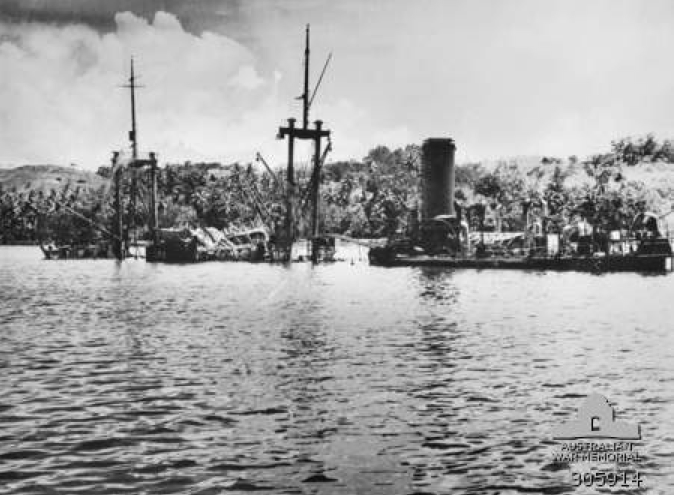
Wreck of the cargo ship Bantam, Oro Bay, New Guinea

On the night of 11–12 December 1942 Karsik, escorted by HMAS Lithgow, was the first large ship to arrive at Oro Bay. She delivered four Stuart light tanks, which were then taken by barges and landed within miles of the battlefront at Buna. Mayo notes the fact a large ship had arrived and thus the supply line had opened as having perhaps even greater significance than the arrival of the tanks. The subsequent, routine, supply runs of Operation Lilliput supporting the Allied campaign were with few exceptions made by the KPM ships, some of which were damaged or lost.

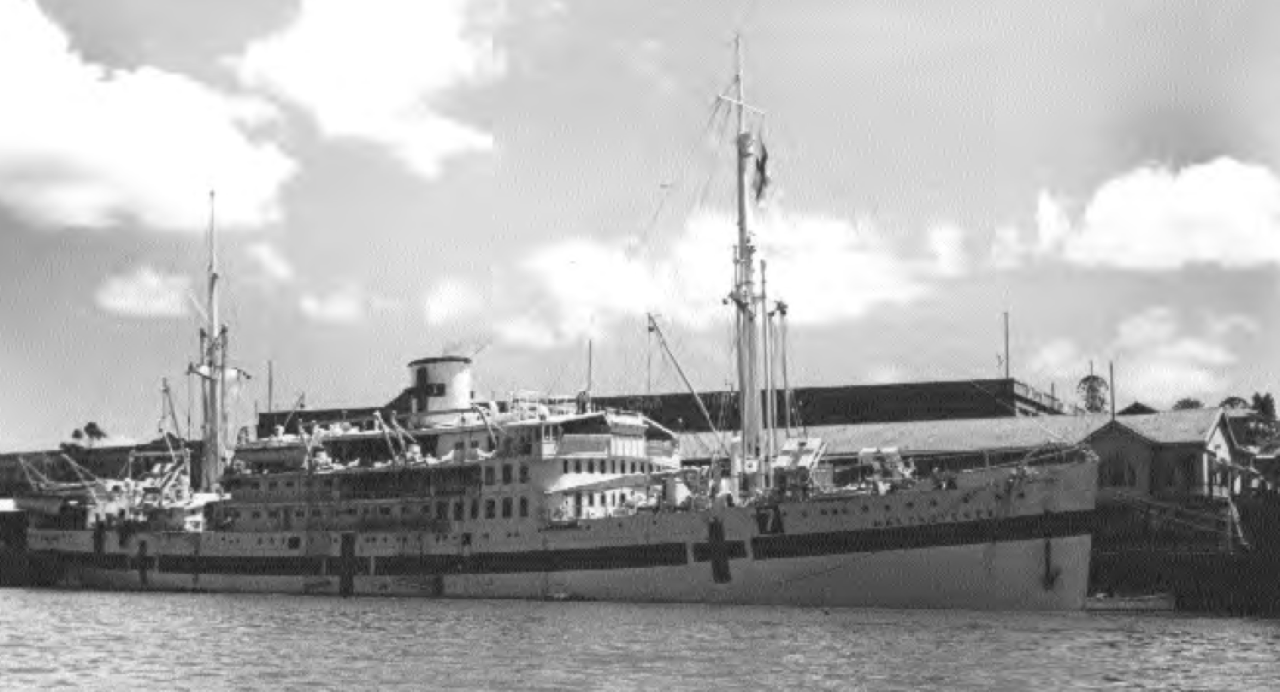
Maetsuycker was the Southwest Pacific Area inter-base hospital ship

Two of the ships, Maetsuycker and Tasman, were converted to hospital ships to handle casualties in the New Guinea campaign. Both ships, though under United States Army control, were Dutch-registered and certified as hospital ships under the Hague Convention by the Dutch government-in-exile.

=== Losses ===
Nearly 100 KPM ships were sunk by enemy action, with the loss of more than a thousand lives. Most of the losses were in 1942. That January, Van Imhoff left the Dutch East Indies and headed for Colombo in Ceylon, carrying several hundred German internees. On 19 January, Japanese aircraft sank her west of Sumatra, killing 413 people. On 26 February Rooseboom left Batavia carrying 500 evacuees, including 250 British soldiers, headed for Padang on Sumatra. On 1 March I-59 sank her by torpedo, killing about 500 of the people aboard. Only six people survived.

The largest ship that KPM lost was Nieuw Zeeland. In November 1942 she carried troops for Operation Torch, the Allied invasion of French North Africa. She reached Oran on 8 November and landed 1,933 troops, but on 11 November U-380 sank her by torpedo as she was approaching the Strait of Gibraltar on her return voyage. 14 members of her crew were killed, and another four died of wounds after being rescued.

== Post-war ==
With the declaration of independence and the establishment of Indonesia as a nation in 1945 and 1949 respectively, the highly profitable KPM remained under Dutch ownership and management. KPM became a major focus for Indonesian activists seeking to reduce Dutch influence in the post-colonial economy. After competing with the national Pelayaran Nasional Indonesia (National Indonesian Shipping) line and demonstrations by the trade union laborers on 3 December 1957, KPM was faced with nationalization and so decided to move its headquarters and international shipping assets to Singapore in 1958. From that base, KPM bought control of Maatschappij Zeetransport (the Oranje Lijn) of Rotterdam, thus entering the European-Canadian trade. This effort was unsuccessful, so KPM sold its Oranje Lijn holdings, and the company was liquidated.

KPM itself continued until 1 January 1967, when it merged with the Koninklijke Java China Paketvaart Lijnen (KJCPL) of Amsterdam. Crews and ships continued service with other lines until finally all former KPM elements were taken over by Nedlloyd in 1977.

The company later merged into Nedlloyd, which in turn merged into P&O Nedlloyd which became part of Maersk Line.

== Cited works ==
- Bekker, H.Th. (1950). De K.P.M. in oorlogstijd — 1939–1945. Amsterdam: J.H. de Bussy.
- Bykofsky, Joseph; Larson, Harold (1990) [1957]. The Technical Services—The Transportation Corps: Operations Overseas (PDF). United States Army in World War II. Washington, DC: Center of Military History United States Army. Archived from the original (PDF) on 27 September 2012.
- Gill, G. Hermon (1957). Royal Australian Navy 1939–1942. Australia in the War of 1939–1945. Series 2 – Navy. Vol. 1. Canberra: Australian War Memorial. Archived from the original on 25 May 2009.
- Gill, G. Hermon (1968). Royal Australian Navy 1939–1942. Australia in the War of 1939–1945. Series 2 – Navy. Vol. 2. Canberra: Australian War Memorial. Archived from the original on 27 September 2013.
- Larsson, Björn (2 April 2011). "KPM Line (Koninklijke Paketvaart Maatschappij – Royal Packet Navigation Co.)". Maritime Timetable Images.
- Lindblad, J Thomas (2011). "The Economic Decolonisation of Indonesia: a Bird's-eye View". Journal of Indonesian Social Sciences and Humanities. 4: 1–20. doi:10.14203/jissh.v4i0.71.
- Lintsen, HW (1993). Geschiedenis van de techniek in Nederland. De wording van een moderne samenleving 1800-1890. Deel IV.
- Masterson, James R. (1949). U.S. Army Transportation In The Southwest Pacific Area 1941–1947. Washington, DC: Transportation Unit, Historical Division, Special Staff, US Army.
- Mayo, Lida (1968). The Technical Services—The Ordnance Department: On Beachhead And Battlefront. United States Army In World War II. Washington, DC: Center Of Military History, United States Army. LCCN 79014631.
- Silver, Christopher (2007). "Tourism, Cultural Heritage, and Human Rights in Indonesia: The Challenges of an Emerging Democratic Society". In Silverman, Helaine; Ruggles, D. Fairchild (eds.). Cultural heritage and human rights. New York: Springer. ISBN 978-0387713137. OCLC 187048155.
- Smith, Clarence McKittrick (1956). The Technical Services—The Medical Department: Hospitalization And Evacuation, Zone of Interior. United States Army in World War II. Washington, DC: Center of Military History, United States Army. LCCN 55060005.
- Swiggum, Susan; Kohli, Marjorie (21 September 2010). "Koninklijke Paketvaart Maatschappij 1888–1967". The ShipsList.
- US Embassy in Indonesia (10 December 1957). "Telegram From the U.S. Embassy in Indonesia to the Department of State (Djakarta, December 10, 1957–2 p.m.)". US Department of State.
- Vickers, Adrian (2005). A History of Modern Indonesia. Cambridge University Press. ISBN 0-521-54262-6.
