= SS Ophir =

Dutch steamship that served in the US Navy and was gutted by fire

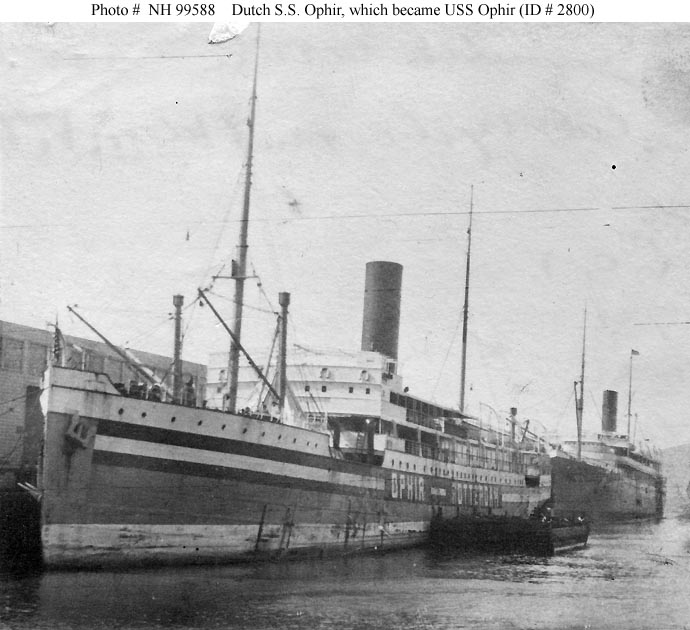
- Ophir with Dutch neutrality markings in the First World War

History

Netherlands
- Name: Ophir
- Namesake: Ophir
- Owner: Rotterdamsche Lloyd
- Operator: 1904: Wm Ruys & Zonen; 1918: (United States) US Navy
- Port of registry: (Netherlands) Rotterdam
- Route: 1904: Rotterdam – Dutch East Indies; 1918: San Francisco – Java
- Builder: Kon Maats 'De Schelde'
- Yard number: 112
- Laid down: 30 November 1903
- Launched: 27 August 1904
- Completed: 14 November 1904
- Acquired: by US Govt, 21 March 1918
- Commissioned: into US Navy, 25 March 1918
- Decommissioned: 16 January 1920
- Identification: code letters PNLC; 1913: call sign MRJ; 1914: call sign PFB; 1918: ID number ID–2800
- Fate: Gutted by fire 1918, scrapped 1922

General characteristics
- Type: ocean liner
- Tonnage: 4,726 GRT, 1,005 NRT, 4,650 DWT
- Length: 394.4 ft (120.2 m)
- Beam: 47.1 ft (14.4 m)
- Depth: 27.2 ft (8.3 m)
- Decks: 3
- Installed power: 521 NHP, 3,600 ihp
- Propulsion: 1 × screw; 1 × triple-expansion engine
- Speed: 14 knots (26 km/h)
- Capacity: passengers: 60 × 1st class, 32 × 2nd class, 24 × 3rd class and 30 × steerage
- Sensors & processing systems: by 1910: submarine signalling
- Armament: in US Navy: 1 × 6-inch/50-caliber gun; 1 × 4-inch/50-caliber gun
- Notes: sister ships: Wilis, Rindjani

SS Ophir was a Dutch steamship that was built in 1904. She carried passengers, cargo and mail between Rotterdam and the Dutch East Indies until March 1918, when the United States seized her under angary and she became USS Ophir (ID-2800). In November 1918 a fire and explosion damaged her beyond economic repair. She was scrapped in 1922.

== Building ==
Between 1903 and 1906 Koninklijke Maatschappij 'De Schelde' in Vlissingen built three sister ships for Rotterdamsche Lloyd. Ophir was built as yard number 112. She was laid down on 30 November 1903, launched on 27 August 1904, undertook her sea trials on 8 November, and was completed on 14 November. She was followed by Wilis, launched in 1905, and Rindjani, launched in 1906.

Ophir's registered length was 394.4 ft (120.2 m), her beam was 47.1 ft (14.4 m) and her depth was 27.2 ft (8.3 m). Her tonnages were 4,726 GRT, 1,005 NRT and 4,650 DWT. She had berths for 146 passengers: 60 first class, 32 second class, 24 third class, and 30 steerage.

Ophir had a single screw, driven by a three-cylinder triple-expansion steam engine. The engine was rated at 521 NHP or 3,600 ihp, and gave her a speed of 14 knots (26 km/h).

== Rotterdamsche Lloyd service ==
Rotterdamsche Lloyd registered Ophir at Rotterdam. Her code letters were PNLC. By 1910 she was equipped for submarine signalling and wireless telegraphy. By 1913 her wireless call sign was MRJ, but by 1914 it had been changed to PFB.

Ophir's peacetime route between Rotterdam and the Dutch East Indies was via the Strait of Gibraltar and Suez Canal. In the First World War the Netherlands were neutral, but Rotterdamsche Lloyd re-routed Ophir via the Cape of Good Hope to avoid hostilities in the Mediterranean. In 1916 the route was changed again, and Ophir went via the Panama Canal. Early in 1918 her route was shortened to San Francisco – Java.

== US Navy service ==
On 20 March 1918 President Woodrow Wilson issued a proclamation seizing all Dutch merchant ships in ports of the USA and its territories. The next day Ophir was taken over at Honolulu, and on 25 March she was commissioned as USS Ophir, with the ID number ID–2800. Her commander was Lieutenant Commander MP Nash, USNRF.

Ophir was armed with one 6-inch/50-caliber gun and one 4-inch/50-caliber gun. She was assigned to the Naval Overseas Transportation Service. On 2 April 1918 she left Pearl Harbor for the Panama Canal. On 14 May she reached New York. She then made three transatlantic round trips between the USA and France.

On the first voyage she left New York on 1 June with four other ships and reached La Pallice on 7 or 9 June. As well as cargo, she carried sailors, tugboat men, and 500 sacks of mail. She returned to New York via Verdun, Quebec, where she called on 27 June.

=== Fire and sinking ===
On 25 October, Ophir started a fourth transatlantic voyage from the East Coast of the United States. Her cargo included coal, drums of "aviation oil" (possibly castor oil), ambulances, and five Jeffery Quad trucks. On 1 November, an ensign of her ship's company died of Spanish flu. On 8 November Ophir left Gibraltar for Marseille. But fire was discovered aboard, thought to be in the lower part of her number two hold, in which she was carrying about 500 tons of coal. She turned back, re-entered Gibraltar on the evening of 10 November, and anchored off the North Mole.

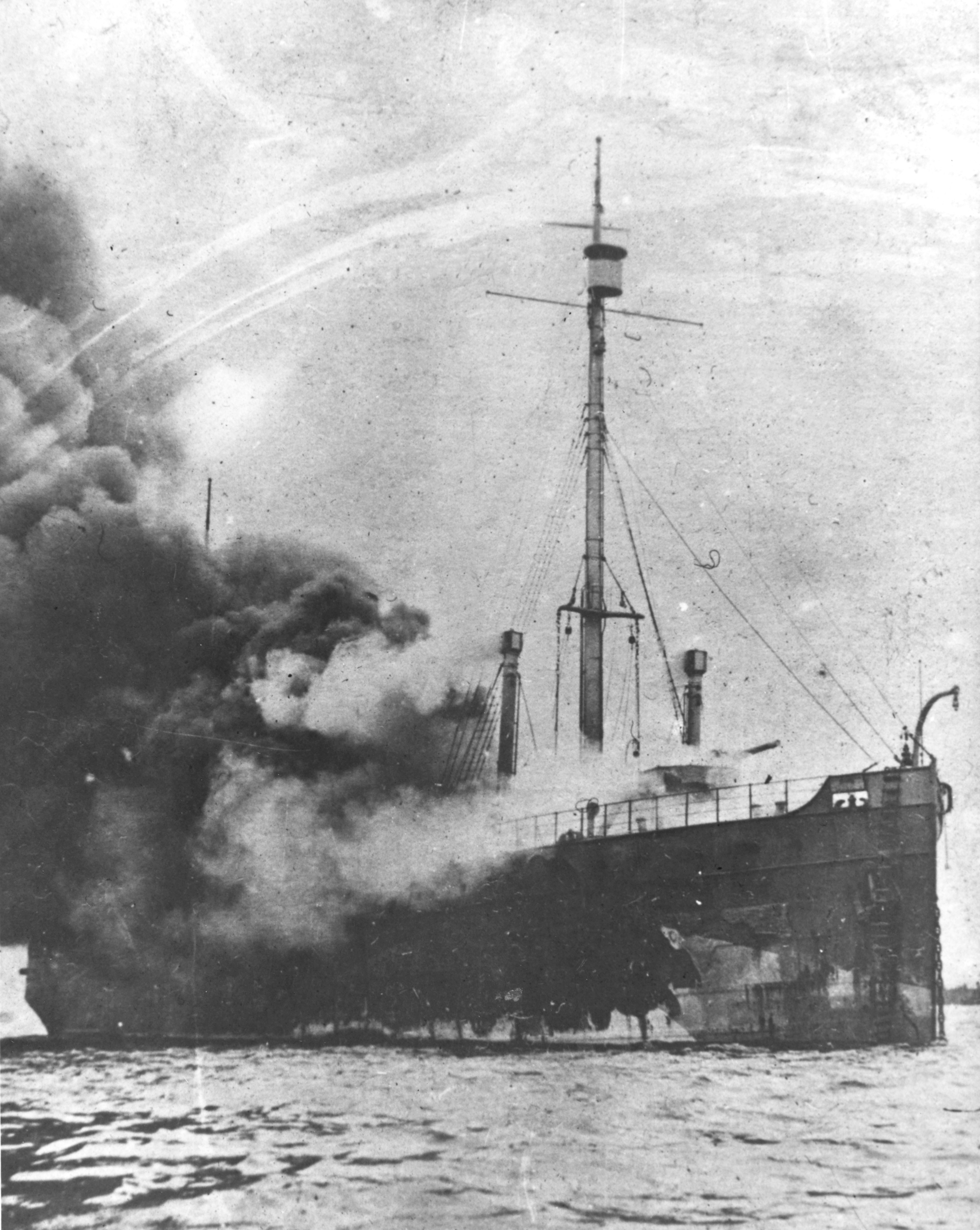
Ophir on fire in Gibraltar in November 1918

Ophir's crew fought the fire with her own firefighting equipment until the evening of 11 November, when an explosion blew the hatches off number two hold and killed two of her enginemen. Water that had been pumped through firehoses into the hold threatened to break through the bulkhead into her fire room. This would extinguish her furnaces and thus disable her pumps. Lieut Cmdr Nash asked permission from the Royal Navy Senior Naval Officer (SNO) for the ship to be beached. The SNO agreed, and a pilot took her to shallows where she was grounded in 4 1/2 fathoms (8 m) of water. Her boilers were put out of action, and the ship continued to burn.

On 16 November 1918 the two dead crewmen were buried in North Front Cemetery, but in June 1919 their bodies were repatriated to the USA. In January 1919 HM Tug Crocodile pumped the water out of Ophir. On 18 January her number one hold and after hold were dry, only 3 feet (1 m) of water remained in her number two hold. Her surviving crew was repatriated to the USA, and a team was sent from the USA to refloat and repair her. She was refloated on 10 February 1919. On 22 May 1919 the five Jeffrey Quad trucks, which had spent weeks under 16 feet (5 m) of water, were sold to a buyer in Cádiz. On 30 July her wreck was offered at auction in London, but no-one bought her.

=== Return voyage ===
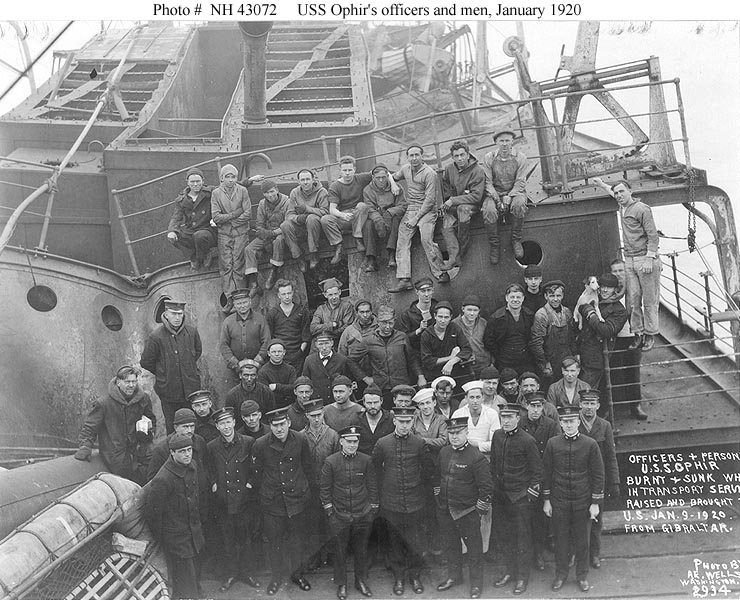
The crew who brought the burnt-out Ophir across the Atlantic in the winter of 1919–20, on deck at Norfolk, Virginia in January 1920

On 25 November 1919, Ophir left Gibraltar under her own power, crewed by six officers and 68 enlisted men, and carrying the wives of eight of the enlisted men as passengers. Only one of her three boilers was working. She called at the Azores, and two days later she broke down. Off Bermuda the minesweeper USS Bobolink took her in tow. About 100 nautical miles (190 km) off Cape Henry they encountered a storm, which broke the tow rope. Ophir drifted for 36 hours in 100-mile-per-hour (160 km/h) wind and heavy sea. Eventually the storm abated, and on 9 January 1920 she reached Norfolk, Virginia under her own power. On 16 January she was decommissioned and transferred to the Department of War.

In February 1920 the Beaver Steamship Company bought the wreck. She remained at Philadelphia until 1922, when she was scrapped.

== Bibliography ==
- Cooper, James; Haws, Duncan (1998). Rotterdam Lloyd. Merchant Fleets. Vol. 35. Pembroke: Travel Creatours Ltd Publications. ISBN 0-946378-35-5.
- Lloyd's Register of British and Foreign Shipping. Vol. I.–Steamers. London: Lloyd's Register of Shipping. 1910 – via Internet Archive.
- The Marconi Press Agency Ltd (1913). The Year Book of Wireless Telegraphy and Telephony. London: The St Katherine Press.
- The Marconi Press Agency Ltd (1914). The Year Book of Wireless Telegraphy and Telephony. London: The Marconi Press Agency Ltd.
