= Royal Rotterdam Lloyd =

Former Dutch shipping company

Koninklijke Rotterdamsche Lloyd Royal Rotterdam Lloyd

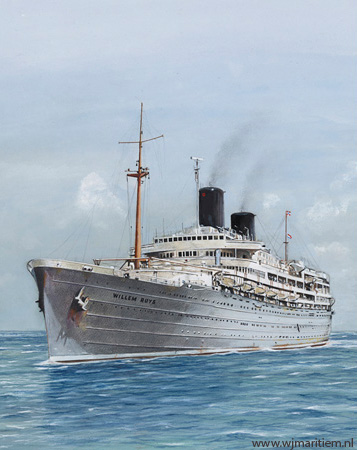
- Painting by WJ Hoendervanger of Willem Ruys
- Type: Public
- Industry: Shipping line
- Founded: 1883; 143 years ago
- Defunct: 1970; 56 years ago
- Fate: succeeded by Nedlloyd
- Successor: Nedlloyd
- Headquarters: Rotterdam, Netherlands
- Area served: Netherlands; East Indies
- Services: ocean Liners; cargo ships
- Parent: Nederlandsche Scheepvaart Unie

Royal Rotterdam Lloyd (Koninklijke Rotterdamsche Lloyd or KRL) was a Dutch shipping line that was established in Rotterdam in 1883 as Rotterdamsche Lloyd (RL). It became "Royal Rotterdam Lloyd" in 1947. RL mainly operated scheduled passenger and mail services between Rotterdam and the Dutch East Indies. Its independent existence ended in 1970, when KRL merged with four other Dutch shipping companies to form the Nederlandsche Scheepvaart Unie (NSU). In 1977 NSU became Nedlloyd.

== History ==
Willem Ruys (1809–1889) was a shipbroker, freight forwarder and insurance agent in Rotterdam. In 1838 he entered into his first partenrederij, trading with the Dutch East Indies and the Far East. After the Suez Canal opened in 1869, his son Willem Ruys (1837–1901) expanded the company in 1872 with a steamship service to Batavia.

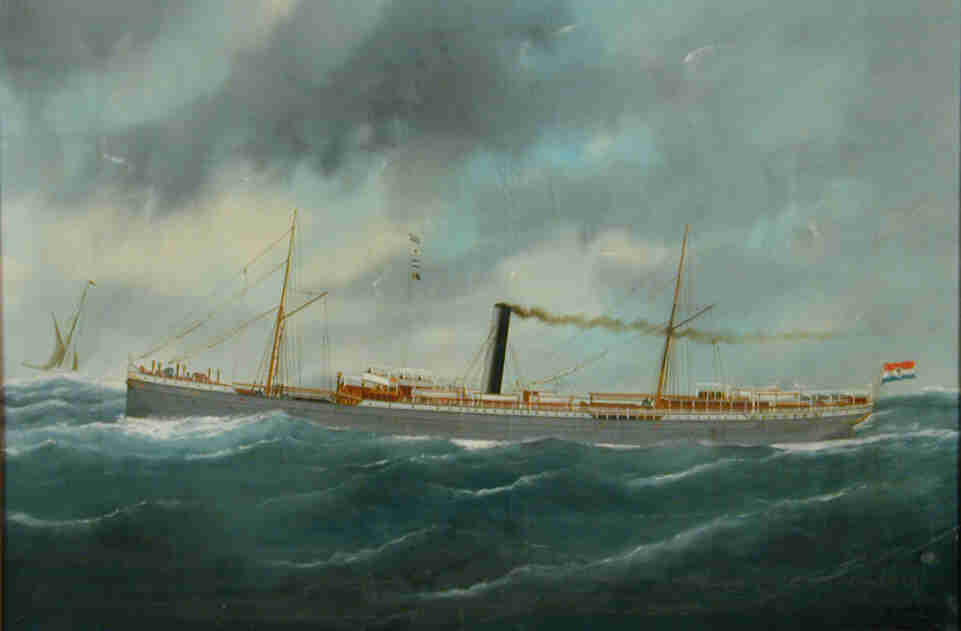
1899 painting by Edouard Adam of Gedé, built for Rotterdamsche Lloyd in 1892

In 1875 Willem Ruys founded Partenrederij Stoomboot Reederij "Rotterdamsche Lloyd". In 1881 the company was renamed Stoomvaart Maatschappij "Rotterdamsche Lloyd". On June 15, 1883 it was converted into the public limited company Rotterdamsche Lloyd NV. It had a fleet of seven ships, each owned by a different partenrederij, but all managed by Wm. Ruys & Zonen.

== First World War ==
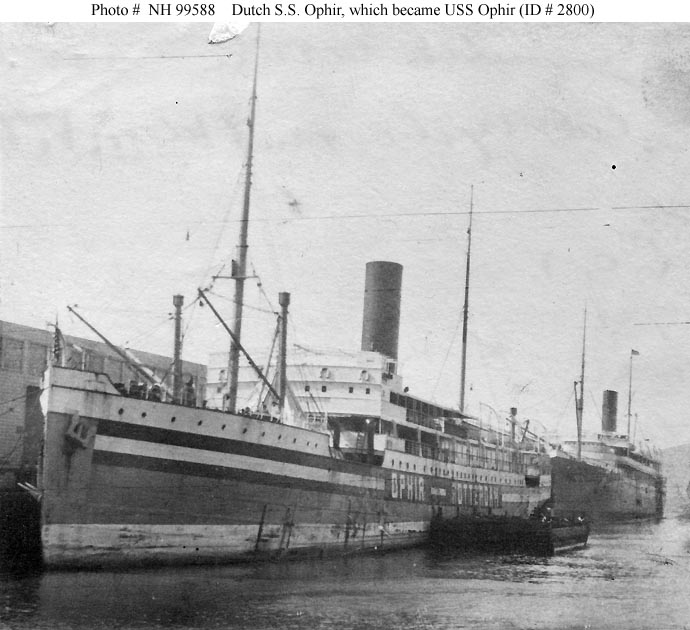
Ophir, with the Dutch flag, her name, and port of registration painted along her side to show her neutrality

The Netherlands were neutral in the First World War. The hulls of Dutch merchant ships were clearly marked, with their name and port of registry painted along their side in large capital letters. Large Dutch flags were also painted on their sides. However, the Imperial German Navy attacked numerous Dutch ships, usually sinking them.

Four RL ships were sunk, and at least one was damaged. On February 15, 1916, Bandoeng was damaged in the North Sea by a mine laid by UC-5. On March 18, 1916 Palembang was sunk in the North Sea by a mine laid by UC-10. On December 1, 1916 U-47 torpedoed Kediri in the Canary Islands.

On February 1, 1917, Germany resumed unrestricted submarine warfare. On February 22, U-21 torpedoed the Norwegian cargo ship Normanna in the Celtic Sea, and then attacked a Dutch convoy that stopped to rescue survivors. U-21 sank six Dutch ships, including two of RL's. One was Bandoeng, which had survived being mined a year before. The other RL ship that U-21 sank was Jacatra. A boarding party from U-21 detonated scuttling charges aboard a third RL ship, Menado, but she remained afloat.

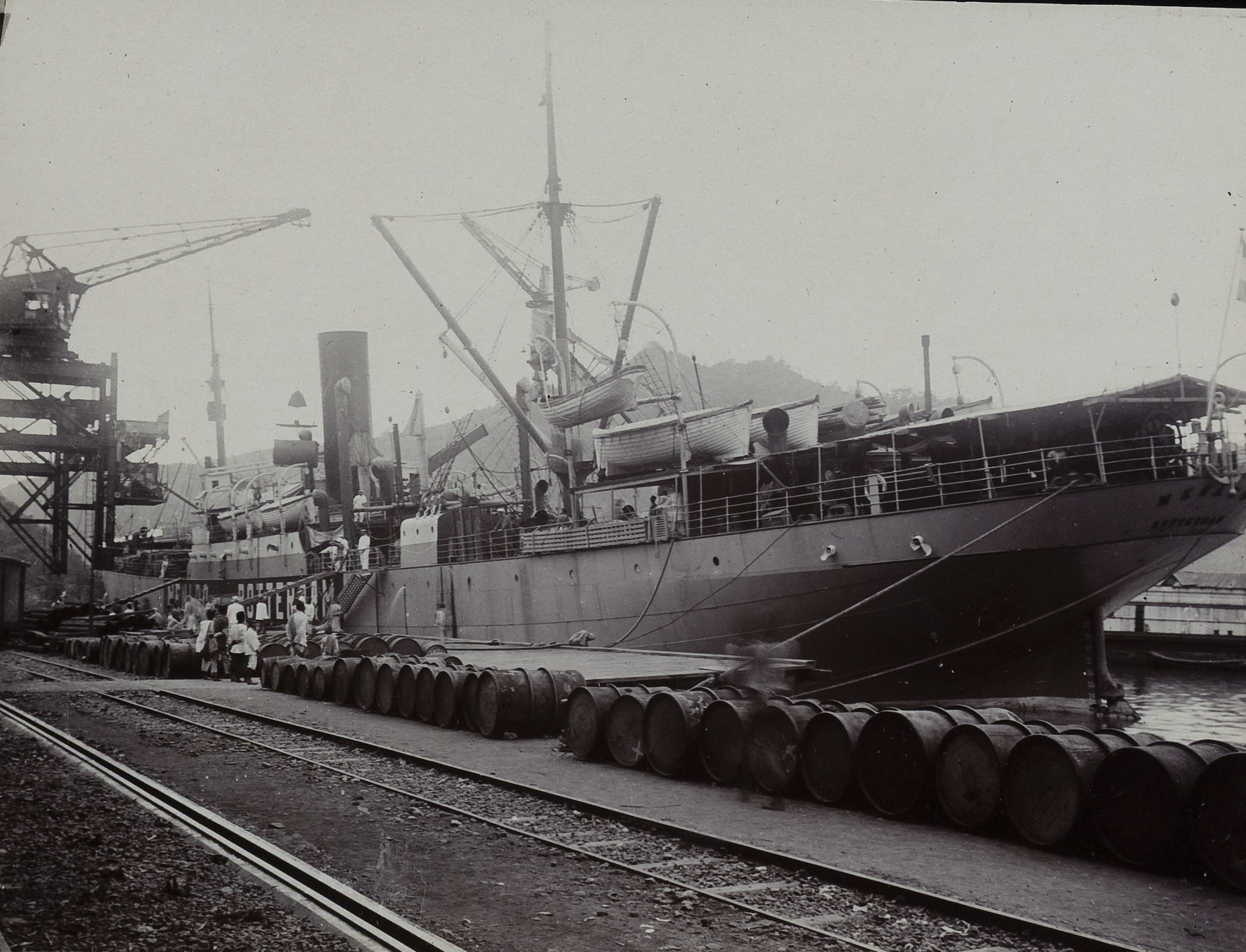
Menado, which survived U-21's attempt to scuttle her in 1917

=== Rotterdam Lloyd ships seized by the Allies ===
In April 1917 the USA declared war against the Central Powers. By June 1917, US authorities were detaining Dutch merchant ships in US ports. In March 1918 the United States Customs Service seized 89 Dutch ships under angary, including at least 11 RL ships: Arakan, Besoeki, Gorontalo, Malang, Merauke, Ophir, Samarinda, Ternate and Texel. The United Kingdom also seized Dutch merchant ships, including RL's Goentoer, Madioen and Pontianak.

At least eight RL ships were commissioned into the United States Navy. Other RL ships remained civilian, but controlled by the United States Shipping Board or the UK Shipping Controller. Two RL ships were lost in US service. On June 2, 1918, U-151 torpedoed Texel in the North Atlantic south of New York. In November 1918 Ophir caught fire off Gibraltar, which led to an explosion on November 11 that killed two of her crew. Ophir was salvaged in 1919, but not returned to her owners, and in 1922 she was scrapped.

=== Reparations ===
RL received three German ships as reparations. In 1918 DDG Hansa's Uhenfels was renamed Bandoeng, Hamburg America Line's Westmark was renamed Jacatra. In 1921 Woermann-Linie's uncompleted Wadai was completed as RL's Tjerimai.

== Larger liners ==
Indrapoera in dry dock in July 1931

In the 1920s and 30s RL added new ships to its fleet, including larger ocean liners. Slamat was built in 1924 and Indrapoera was built in 1925. They were both about 11,000 GRT, but Slamat was a steam turbine ship and Indrapoera was a motor ship. In 1928 they were joined by the 12,000 GRT motor ship Sibajak.

RL's largest ships between the two World wars were a pair of 17,000 GRT motor ships: Baloeran built in 1929, and her sister ship Dempo built in 1930. RL ordered a 21,000 GRT motor ship in 1938, and she was laid down in 1939, but she was still being built when Germany invaded the Netherlands in May 1940.

== Second World War ==
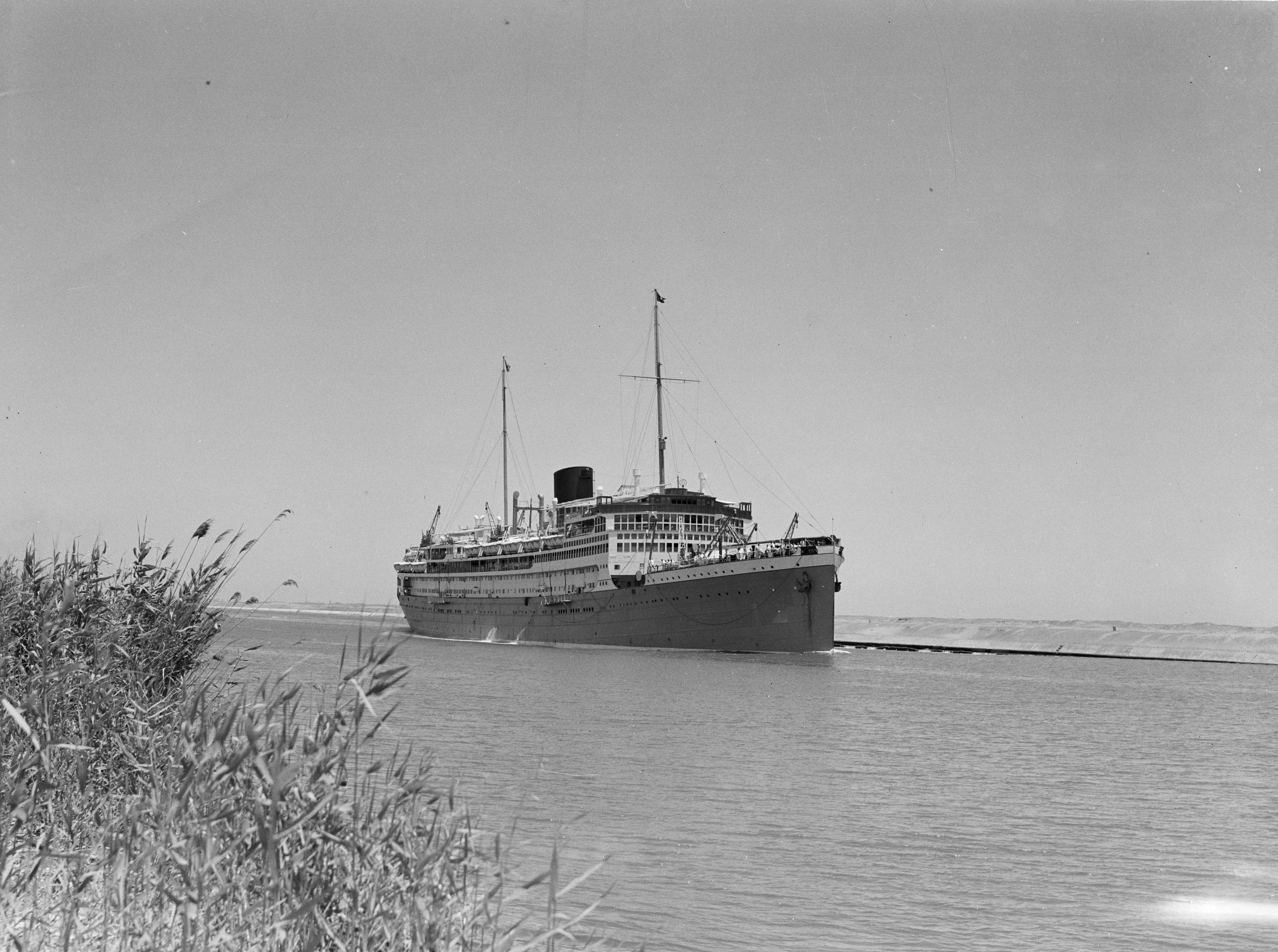
Baloeran in the Suez Canal in 1935

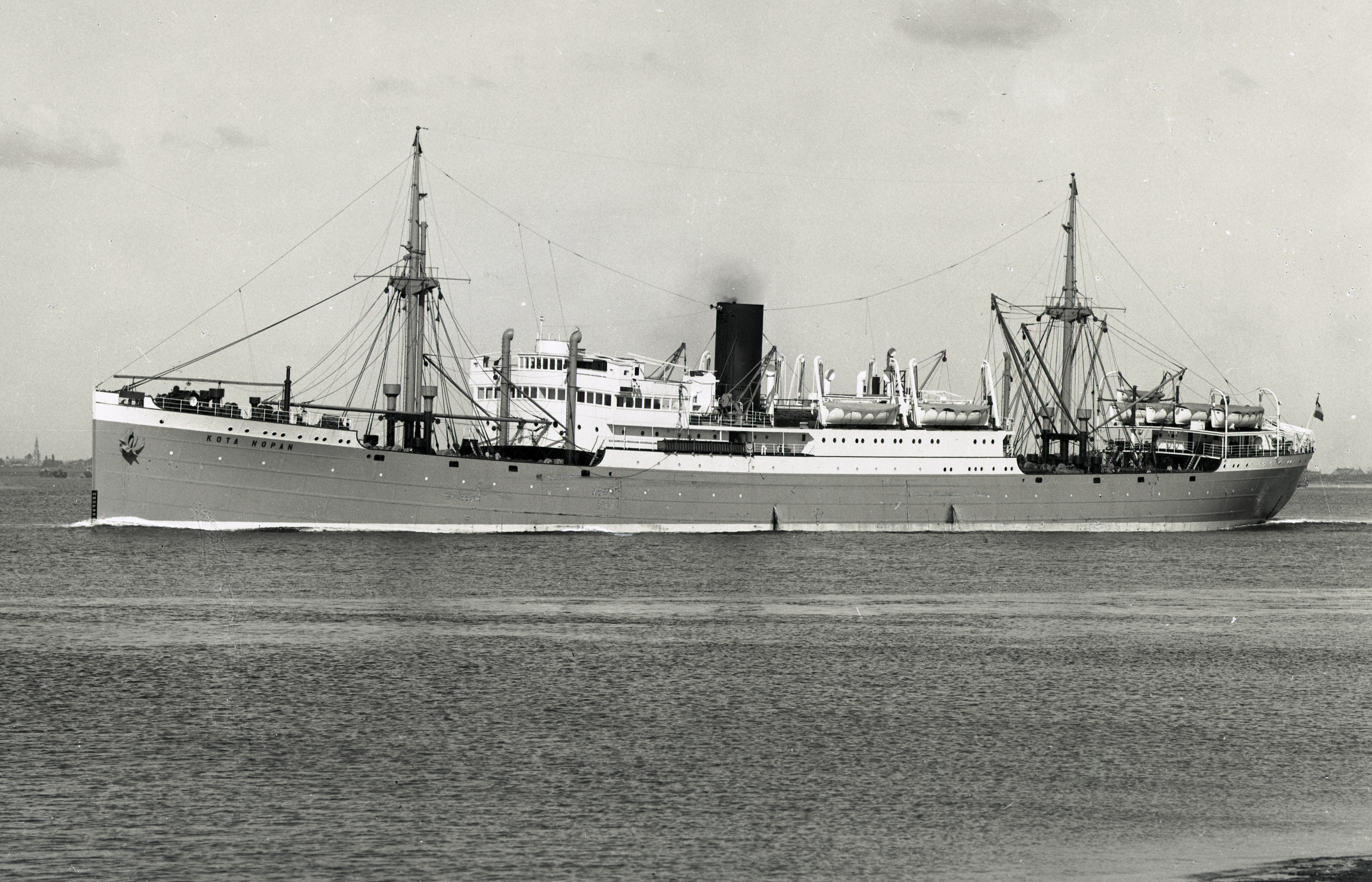
Kota Nopan (1931) was lost in 1943

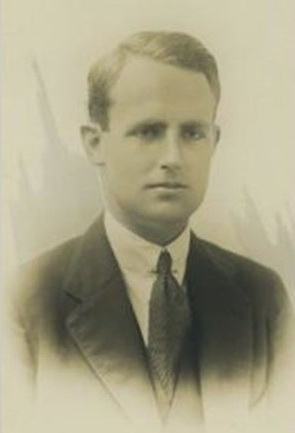
Director Willem Ruys, whom the Nazis executed in 1942

Enemy action in the Second World War sank at least 16 RL ships, with the loss of about 1,000 lives. Smaller numbers of RL ships were either captured by German forces and later sunk by Allied action, or scuttled to prevent capture.

On April 27, 1941, German air attacks during the German invasion of Greece sank Slamat, which by then was a troopship, and then sank two Royal Navy destroyers that had rescued her survivors. The Slamat disaster is the biggest loss of life in Dutch merchant navy history. 983 people were killed, most of them from Slamat.

In the German invasion of the Netherlands in May 1940, Baloeran was captured. She was converted into a German hospital ship and renamed Strassburg. On September 1, 1943 she was mined off IJmuiden, and grounded. Later that month, a British air raid set her on fire, and then a Royal Navy torpedo boat destroyed her.

Baloeran's sister ship Dempo became an Allied troopship. U-371 sank her by torpedo in the Mediterranean on March 17, 1944. Dempo was the largest Dutch ship sunk in the Second World War.

On March 16, 1941 the German battleship Scharnhorst sank the RL steamship Mangkai by shellfire, killing 36 of her crew. On June 19, 1944 U-181 sank the turbine steamship Garoet, killing 89 of her 99 crew.

On March 1, 1942 the Imperial Japanese Navy sank two RL cargo ships. The cruiser Chikuma shelled the motor ship Modjokerto in the Indian Ocean south of Christmas Island, severely damaging her. The submarine I-58 then sank her by torpedo, killing 42 of her crew. On the same day, I-58 sank by torpedo the turbine steamship Langkoeas, whose crew launched two lifeboats. I-58 rammed one of the lifeboats and machine-gunned the other. 91 of Langkoeas' 94 crew were killed. The Japanese Navy took 35 survivors from Modjokerto to Kendari Airport on Sulawesi, where they beheaded them and buried them in a mass grave.

The German occupiers of the Netherlands arrested director Willem Ruys (1894–1942) as a hostage in July 1942, and executed him a month later. RL's first new passenger ship after the war, whose building had started in 1939, was completed in 1947 as Willem Ruys in his honour.

== Later years ==
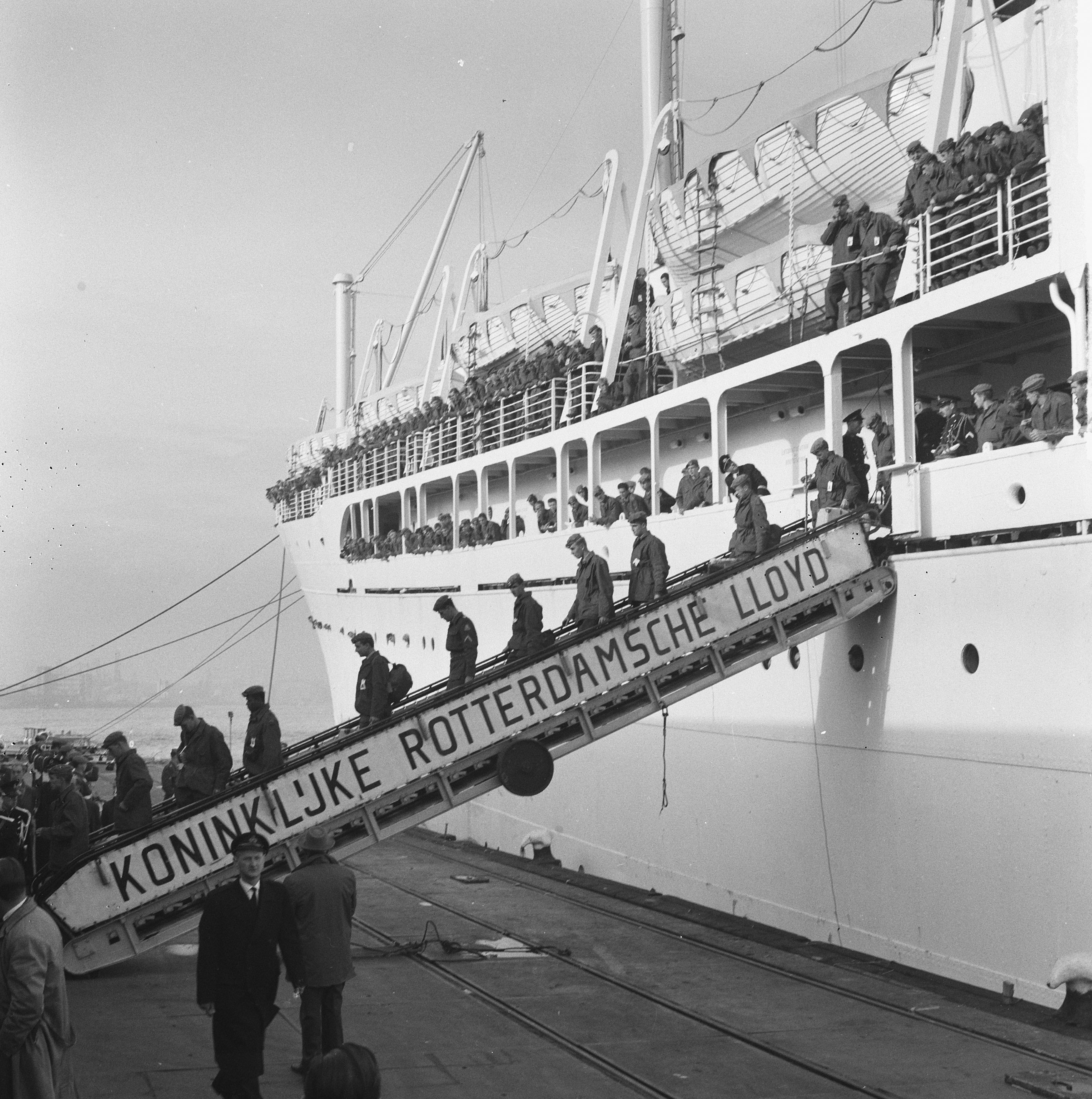
Troops dismbarking from a KRL ship in 1962 after returning home from the end of Dutch rule in New Guinea

Indonesia won its independence in 1949, the Dutch colonial empire declined, and commercial aviation took an increasing share of passenger travel. Sibajak was converted into an emigrant ship in 1951, and scrapped in 1959. Indrapoera was sold in 1956. In Willem Ruys was sold to the Italian shipping magnate Achille Lauro, who renamed her after himself.

KRL sought new trades. New ships included the 12,000 GRT oil tankers Ameland, built in 1956, and Vlieland, built in 1959. Smit-Lloyd was founded in 1964, together with Smit International, to operate platform supply vessels for the offshore.

On January 20, 1970, KRL merged with four other Dutch shipping companies to form the Nederlandsche Scheepvaart Unie (NSU). In 1977 NSU became NedLloyd, and in 1997 it became P&O Nedlloyd. The archives of the KRL were transferred to the municipal archives of Rotterdam.

== Bibliography ==
- J. Cooper, D.Haws, Rotterdam Lloyd, Pembroke, 1998 ISBN 0-946378-35-5
- N. Guns, Koninklijke Rotterdamsche Lloyd. Beknopte geschiedenis van een rederij, Zutphen, 2004 ISBN 9057303310
- B.W. Scholten, F.M.E.W. Haalmeijer, Rotterdamsche Lloyd, Houten, 1988 ISBN 9026944977
- J. van Beylen e.a. (editor), Maritieme Encyclopedie. Deel IV, Bussum, 1971, pp. 132–133 ISBN 9022810062
- F.van der Stel, Rotterdamsche Lloyd, Rosmalen, 2004 ISBN 9080800228
