= SS Goentoer =

Dutch mail steamship that was a UK troopship in the First World War

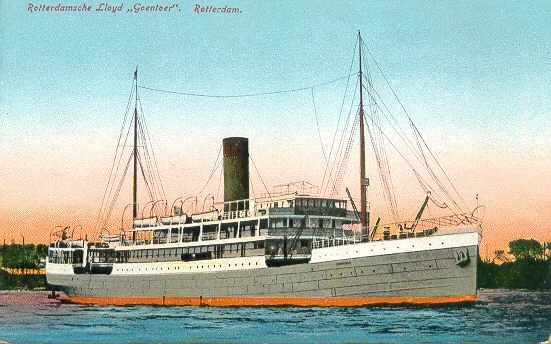
- Postcard of Goentoer

History
- Name: Goentoer
- Namesake: Mount Guntur
- Owner: 1902: Rotterdamsche Lloyd; 1918: Shipping Controller; 1919: Rotterdamsche Lloyd
- Operator: 1902: Wm Ruys & Zonen; 1918: British India SN Co; 1919: Wm Ruys & Zonen
- Port of registry: 1902: (Netherlands) Rotterdam; 1918: (United Kingdom) London; 1902: (Netherlands) Rotterdam
- Route: Rotterdam – Sumatra – Java
- Builder: KM 'De Schelde' S&M, Vlissingen
- Yard number: 94
- Laid down: 26 February 1901
- Launched: 11 January 1902
- Completed: 15 April 1902
- Identification: 1902: code letters NTSL; by 1913: call sign MRQ; from 1914: call sign PFA; 1918: UK official number 140135; 1918: code letters TWMQ
- Fate: Scrapped in 1925

General characteristics
- Type: passenger ship
- Tonnage: 5,894 GRT, 3,775 NRT, 5,161 DWT
- Length: 425.9 ft (129.8 m)
- Beam: 50.0 ft (15.2 m)
- Depth: 31.0 ft (9.4 m)
- Decks: 3
- Installed power: 567 NHP, 4,300 ihp
- Propulsion: 2 × screws; 2 × quadruple expansion engines
- Speed: 14 knots (26 km/h)
- Capacity: passengers: 81 × 1st class, 42 × 2nd class, 24 × 3rd class; cargo: 195,000 cu ft (5,500 m^{3}) bale
- Sensors & processing systems: by 1910: submarine signalling
- Notes: sister ship: Sindoro

SS Goentoer was a Dutch passenger and mail ship that was built for Rotterdamsche Lloyd in 1902 and scrapped in 1925. Her regular route was between Rotterdam and the Dutch East Indies. She was a UK troop ship from 1918 to 1919, after being seized under angary in Singapore.

== Building ==
Between 1899 and 1902 Koninklijke Maatschappij 'De Schelde'. Scheepswerf en Machinefabriek in Vlissingen built a pair of mail steamers for Willem Ruys & Zonen's Rotterdamsche Lloyd company. Yard number 90 was laid down in February 1899, and launched in February 1902 as Sindoro, and completed in March 1902. Her sister ship was laid down on 26 February 1901 as yard number 94, launched on 11 January 1902 as Goentoer, and completed on 15 April 1902. The ships were named after two volcanoes on Java: Mount Sindoro and Mount Guntur.

Goentoer's registered length was 425.9 ft (129.8 m), her beam was 50.0 ft (15.2 m) and her depth was 31.0 ft (9.4 m). Her tonnages were 5,894 GRT, 3,775 NRT, and 5,161 DWT. She had berths for 147 passengers: 81 in first class, 42 in second class and 24 in third class. Her holds had capacity for 195,000 cubic feet (5,500 m^{3}) of baled cargo.

The ship had twin screws, each driven by a four-cylinder quadruple expansion steam engine. The combined power of her twin engines was rated at 567 NHP or 4,300 ihp, and gave her a speed of 14 knots (26 km/h).

== Career ==
Rotterdamsche Lloyd registered Goentoer at Rotterdam. Her code letters were NTSL. She joined Sindoro on the company's scheduled service between Rotterdam and Java via Sumatra.

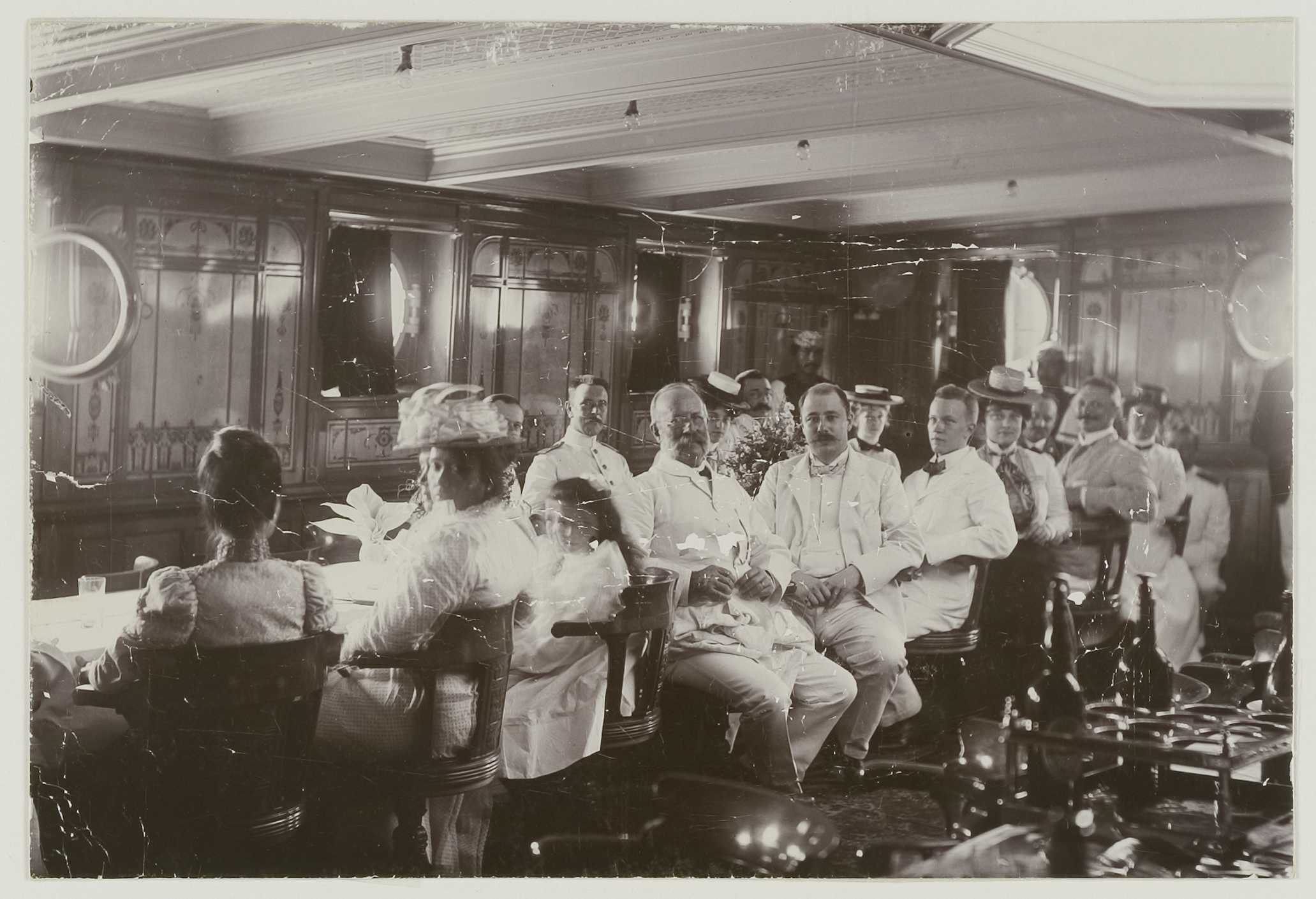
Passengers luhching aboard Goentoer in 1902. At the head of the table is her Master, Captain H le Clercq

By 1910 Goentoer was equipped for submarine signalling and Marconi wireless telegraphy. By 1913 her call sign was MRQ, but by 1914 it had been changed to PFA.

On 13 January 1916 a mine sank the Dutch cargo ship Maasvaven in the North Sea, killing one of her crew. Goentoer, the Stoomvaart Maatschappij Zeeland ferry Prinses Juliana, and another Dutch ship rescued survivors.

In 1918 the Entente Powers gave the Dutch government an ultimatum to place 600,000 GRT of its merchant ships at their disposal by 18 March. On 20 March, President Woodrow Wilson ordered the seizure under angary of 89 Dutch ships in US ports. The UK authorities also seized Dutch merchant ships in British Empire ports. Goentoer was seized in Singapore and vested in the UK Shipping Controller, who had her converted into a troop ship, and appointed the British India Steam Navigation Company to manage her. She was registered in London. Her UK official number was 140135 and her code letters were TWMQ. On 9 October 1919 the UK returned Goentoer to her owners.

In 1922 Sindoro was sold to the Portuguese Companhia Nacional de Navegação, who renamed her Pedro Gomes. Rotterdamsche Lloyd then took delivery of two new 11,000 GRT ocean liners: the turbine steamship Slamat in April 1924, and motor ship Indrapoera in January 1926. In September 1925 the company sold Goentoer for scrap for 150,000 guilders. The buyer was CHC Sunderman of Zwijndrecht in South Holland.

== Bibliography ==
- Lloyd's Register of British and Foreign Shipping. Vol. I.–Steamers. London: Lloyd's Register of Shipping. 1903 – via Internet Archive.
- Lloyd's Register of British and Foreign Shipping. Vol. I.–Steamers. London: Lloyd's Register of Shipping. 1910 – via Internet Archive.
- Mercantile Navy List. London. 1919 – via Crew List Index Project.
- The Marconi Press Agency Ltd (1913). The Year Book of Wireless Telegraphy and Telephony. London: The St Katherine Press.
- The Marconi Press Agency Ltd (1914). The Year Book of Wireless Telegraphy and Telephony. London: The Marconi Press Agency Ltd.
