= MS Maetsuycker =

Dutch hospital ship

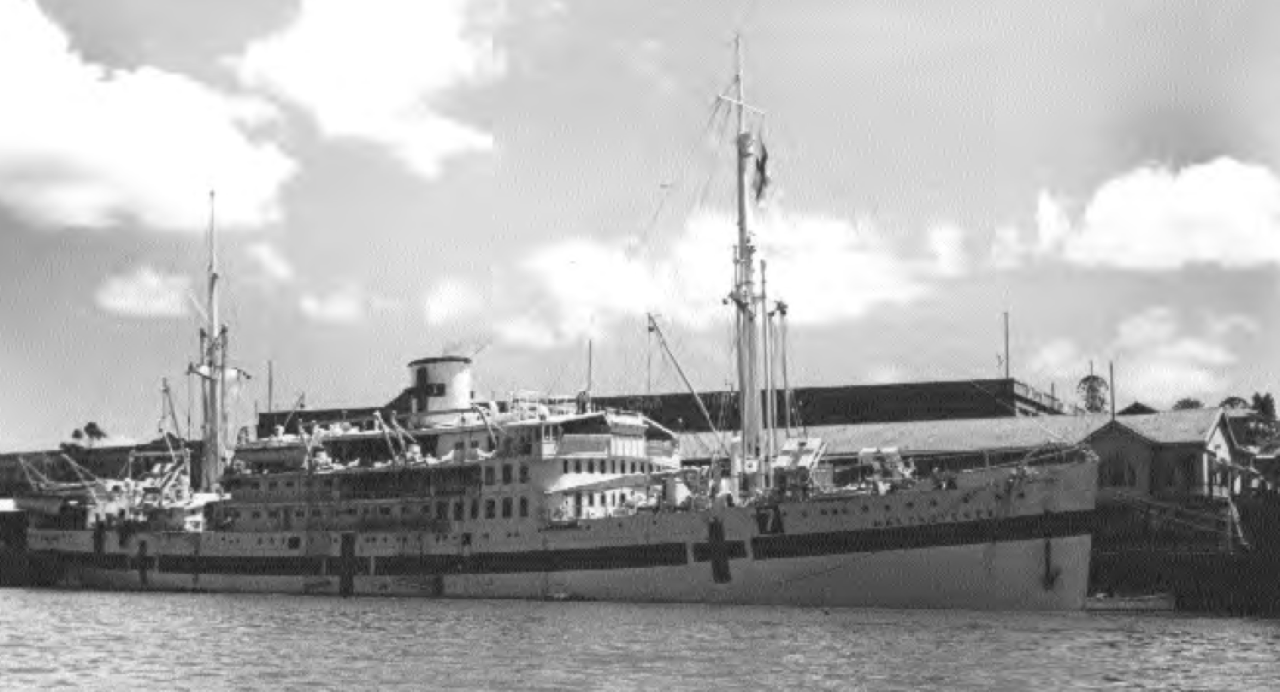
- Maetsuycker as a hospital ship.

History

Netherlands
- Name: MS Maetsuycker
- Namesake: Maetsuycker
- Owner: Koninklijke Paketvaart-Maatschappij; (1936-1942); Australian Merchant Navy; (1942-1944); US Army Transportation Corps; (1944-1947); Royal Interocean Lines; (1947-1960)
- Builder: Nederlandsche Dok en Scheepsbouw Maatschappij
- Yard number: 61
- Laid down: 1936
- Launched: 19 September 1936
- Commissioned: 1937
- Reclassified: AHS Maetsuycker (No.7)
- Identification: Callsign: PSFQ
- Fate: Sold for merchant service in 1960

History

Panama
- Renamed: Tong Han, 1960; Gavina, 1964; Paceco, 1965; Gambela, 1965; Gamsolo, 1970; Hysan, 1971
- Fate: Scrapped at Kaohsiung, Taiwan in 1974

General characteristics
- Type: Cargo ship; Hospital ship; Troopship
- Tonnage: 1675 tones
- Length: 110.2 m (361 ft 7 in)
- Beam: 15.95 m (52 ft 4 in)
- Height: 7.89 m (25 ft 11 in)
- Installed power: 4x Werkspoor Amsterdam 1200 kW each
- Speed: 14.5 knots
- Capacity: 9 landing vessels up to 45 tones each
- Troops: 250 stretcher patients
- Complement: 500 crew

MS Maetsuycker was a Dutch cargo ship built in 1936 and later converted to a hospital ship, cargo ship and troopship, before being sold for merchant use in 1960 and eventually scrapped in 1974. She was named after Dutch colonial governor Joan Maetsuycker (1606–1678).

== Construction and career ==
She was laid down and launched in 1936 and commissioned in 1937. She was owned by Koninklijke Paketvaart-Maatschappij (KPM) of Batavia, Dutch East Indies.

MS Maetsuycker was used as a cargo ship until 1942. She escaped the Dutch Netherlands during the invasion of the Imperial Japanese and set off to Sydney, Australia. In Australia, she was assigned to the Australian Merchant Navy and US Army.

While in the Australian Merchant Navy and US Army Transportation Corps, MS Maetsuycker served as a troop transport and logistic supply ship. Her crew were mainly made out of Australians.

In 1944, she was converted to a hospital ship and designated as AHS Maetsucker in Melbourne with a medical staff were from US Army 196th Station Hospital. She operated in northern New Guinea which including Oro Bay, Milne Bay, Finchafen, Lae and Aitape and Hollandia, then delivering the patients back to Brisbane, Australia for treatments in early 1944. On 23 June, AHS Maetsuycker while off Bosnik, took onboard Captain Cyrus Taylor of PT-193 in who died from his wounds aboard the ship. On 24 December she arrived in Leyte Gulf in the Philippines and was stationed at Tacloban.

After the war, she was refitted in 1947 and passed ownership to the Royal Interocean Lines (KJCPL) in Amsterdam renamed, sold to several owners and renamed again Tong Han, Gavina, Paceco, Gambela, Gamsolo and Hysan from 1960 to 1971. Finally, scrapped and broken up at Kaohsiung, Taiwan in 1974.
