= Netherlands in World War I =

The Netherlands remained neutral during World War I, a stance that arose partly from a strict policy of neutrality in international affairs that started in 1830, with the secession of Belgium from the Netherlands. Dutch neutrality was not guaranteed by the major powers in Europe and was not part of the Dutch constitution. The country's neutrality was based on the belief that its strategic position between the German Empire, German-occupied Belgium, and the British guaranteed its safety.

The Royal Netherlands Army was mobilized throughout the conflict, as belligerents regularly attempted to intimidate the Netherlands and to place demands on it. In addition to providing a credible deterrence, the army had to house refugees, guard internment camps for captured soldiers, and prevent smuggling.

The government also restricted the free movement of people, monitored spies, and took other wartime measures.

== Background ==
Before the First World War, the Netherlands hosted two major international peace conferences. The first, the First Hague Conference, was held in May 1899 on the initiative of Tsar Nicholas II of Russia. Representatives of 26 nations conferred on the limitation of certain types of weapons, including poison gas, hollow point bullets and aerial bombardment from hot air balloons. The conference was a surprising success, and agreements were reached on the laws of war and on war crimes.

== Politics ==
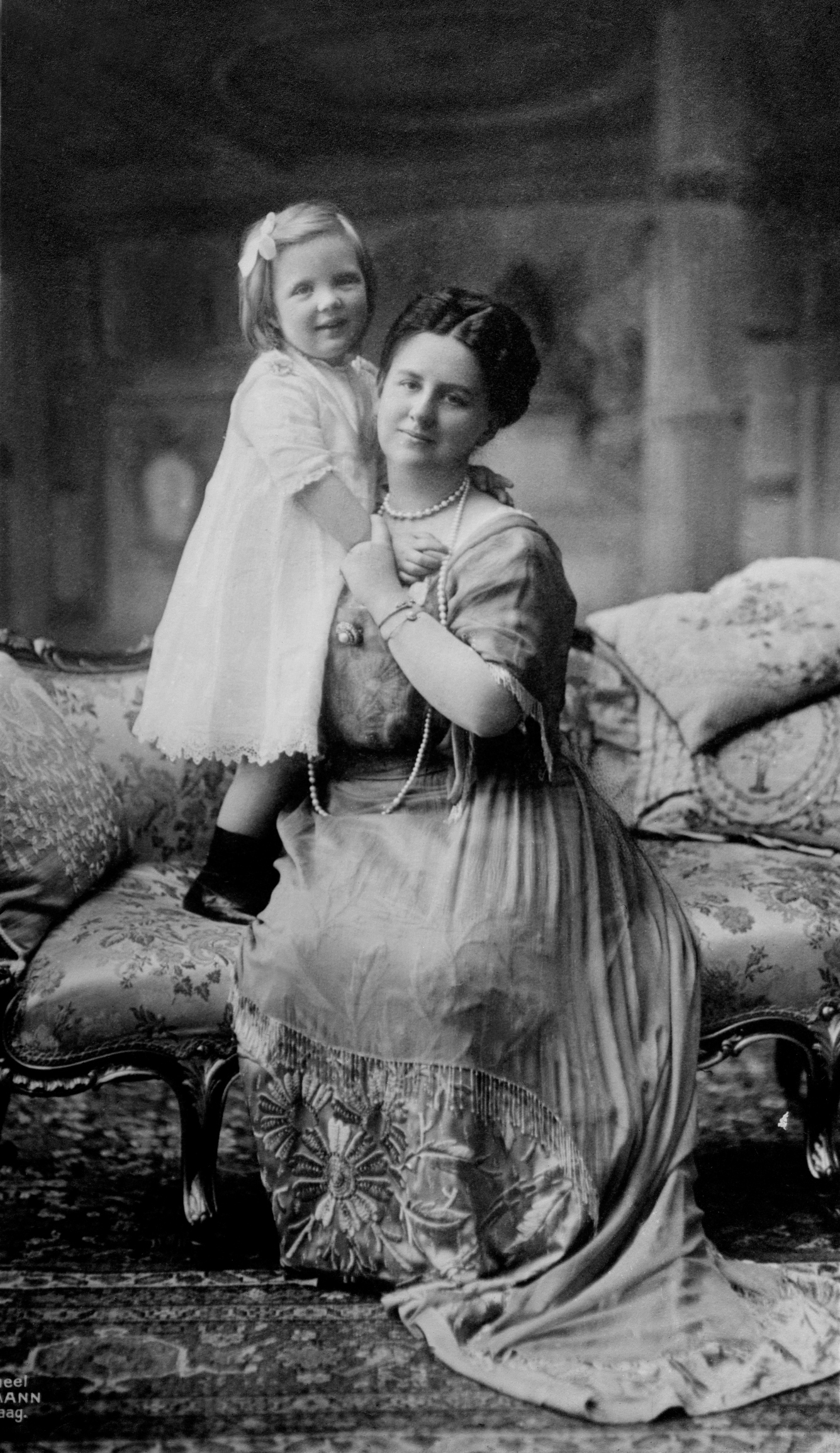
Queen Wilhelmina and her daughter Juliana, circa 1914

The Dutch Queen, Wilhelmina, was known for her fierce patriotism and strong-willed nature. She leaned towards sympathy for France and Belgium but only in private and evinced a neutral stance in public. Her German husband, the prince-consort Duke Henry of Mecklenburg-Schwerin, was openly pro-German. His nephew, Frederick Francis IV, served in the German Army.

On 29 August 1913, a centrist liberal minority cabinet was appointed under the leadership of the independent liberal Prime Minister Pieter Cort van der Linden. His cabinet governed until 9 September 1918, an unusually-long period for a Dutch cabinet. During that period, the important post of Minister of Foreign Affairs was taken by John Loudon.

Although the government as a whole was strictly neutral, each member maintained individual preferences. Some ministers were in favour of France, and Prime Minister Cort van der Linden was privately seen as German-friendly and nicknamed "Kurt Unter der Linden," after Berlin's Unter den Linden boulevard.

During the war, the Dutch people were generally sympathetic towards the Allies. However, in Dutch Protestant or Neo-Calvinist circles, there was sympathy for the German cause, which was partly inspired by the memory of the Second Boer War (1899–1902), in South Africa.

In September 1918, a new Dutch government rose under Charles Ruijs de Beerenbrouck. Noting that Allied victory appeared imminent and fearing revolutionary stirrings at home, the new administration immediately began negotiations with the Allies, concluding an agreement on 25 November 1918, two weeks after the end of the war.

== Neutrality ==
In the aftermath of the assassination of Archduke Franz Ferdinand, Austria-Hungary declared war on the Kingdom of Serbia at 11 a.m. on 28 July 1914. The Dutch declared themselves neutral on 30 July. According to international law, neutrality had to be declared in each instance of a war declaration between two sovereign nations. During August, the Dutch declaration of neutrality had to be repeated regularly.

The declaration consisted of 18 articles. The most important article stated that hostilities were not allowed within the territory and the waters of the Dutch Empire; no nation was allowed to use the territory and the waters as a base for military operations; and that foreign soldiers who, for whatever reason, crossed into Dutch territory would be interned in prisoner-of-war camps for the duration of the war.

=== Violations ===
At the beginning of the war, the German Army marched near the Dutch–Belgian border in the province of Limburg. For a stretch of 500 metres (550 yd) between border markers 42 and 43, the road was half Belgian and half Dutch territory. Dutch border guards made clear which part of the road was Dutch territory, and as a consequence, the German Army avoided it on its westward march. However, the Dutch were falsely accused by Belgian and French newspapers at the time of supporting the German invasion of Belgium.

Both Allied and German military aircraft violated Dutch airspace. On several occasions, Allied and German pilots mistakenly dropped bombs on Dutch towns. The deadliest incident occurred on 30 April 1917, when a Royal Naval Air Service pilot mistakenly dropped eight bombs on the town of Zierikzee, damaged several houses and killed a family of three. After initially denying the incident, the British government apologized and agreed to compensate the Dutch for damage and loss of life. A total of 107 Allied and German aeroplanes and 24 seaplanes landed in the Netherlands, and 220 crewmen were taken prisoner. Of the crashed planes, 67 were repaired and added to the army's air department.

German Zeppelins carrying out bombing raids against the UK frequently violated Dutch airspace because of weather conditions such as wind or fog. It is unclear whether Dutch fire was responsible for the downing of the Zeppelin LZ 54, which came down in the North Sea and led to the King Stephen incident, in which the captain of the British fishing trawler King Stephen, William Martin, refused to rescue the crew of LZ 54, resulting in them drowning.

=== Dutch merchant shipping ===
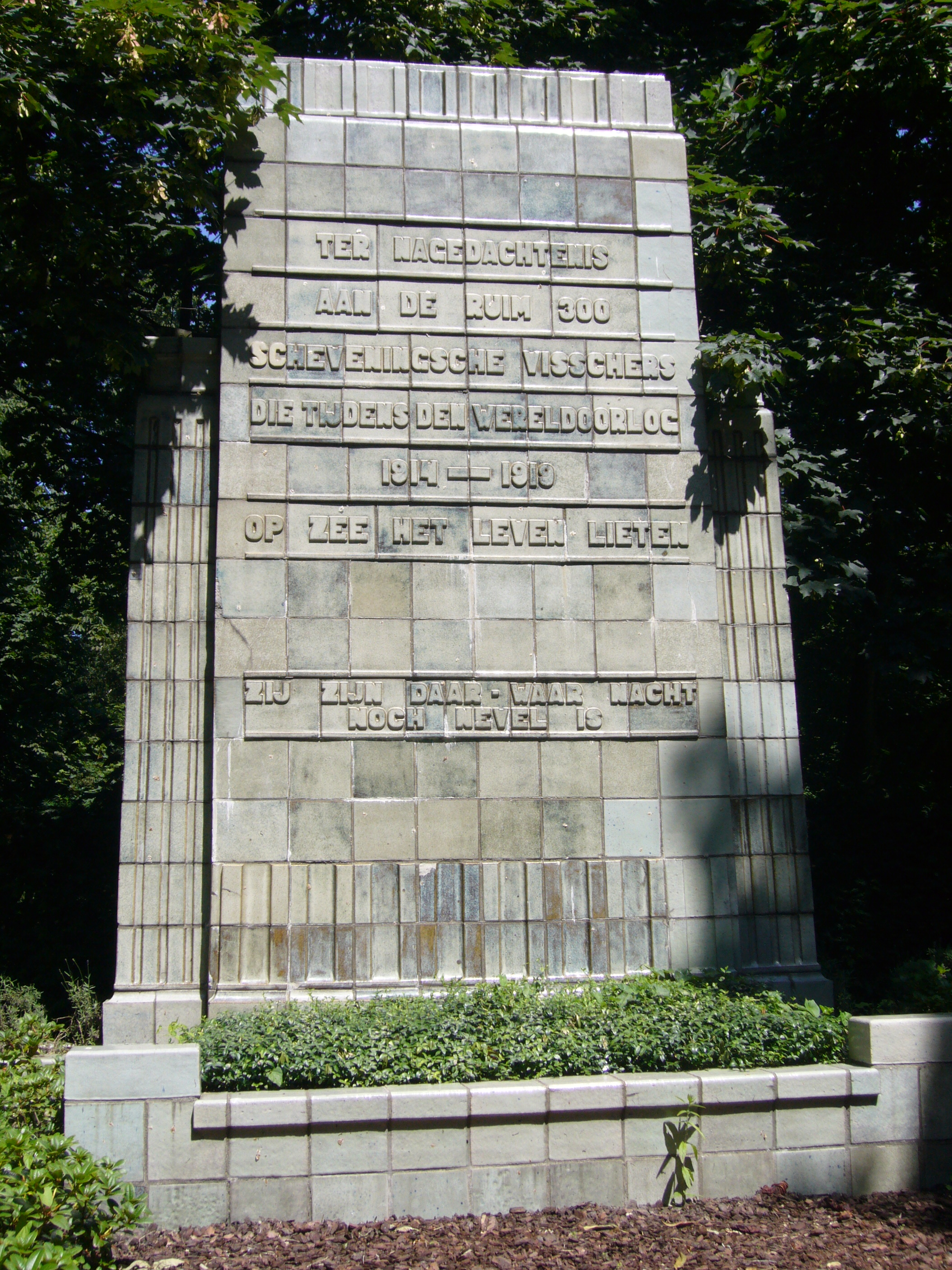
Monument commemorating the dead fishermen of Scheveningen

Dutch artist Piet van der Hem's editorial cartoon decrying the sinking of Tubantia

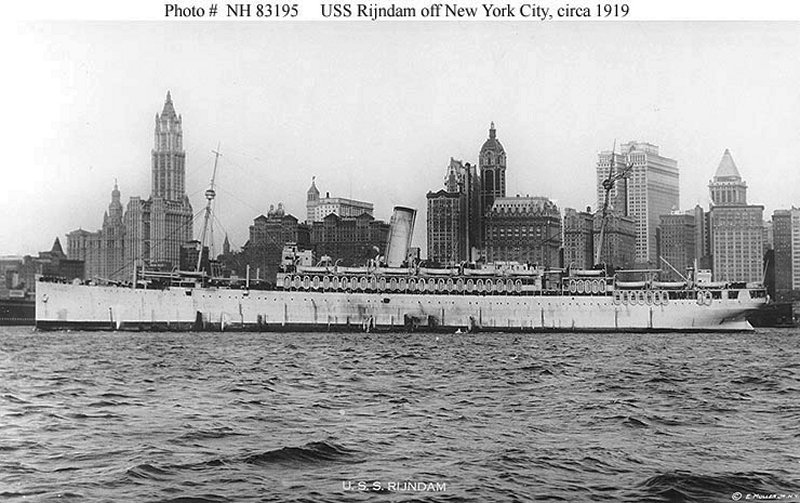
The transatlantic ocean liner Rijndam was one of the ships that the US seized in March 1918

A key aspect of Dutch neutrality was maritime trade. The Netherlands were not included in the allied blockade of Germany, and thus offered a conduit to overseas trade for the Central Powers. The Dutch imported goods from countries such as the US and exported domestic produce to Germany, netting a profit and becoming Germany's biggest food supplier. In the first half of 1916, Dutch food export to Germany was worth around 5 million goldmarks per day. The British negotiated with Dutch representatives in the Netherlands Oversea Trust Company (NOT) to attempt to reduce this, by offering to buy a share of Dutch agricultural product, to initially mixed success. The Dutch agreed that vessels bound to the Netherlands would first dock in Britain and submit to an inspection. Large amounts of smuggling and fraud meant much goods reached Germany regardless.

Dutch vessels used a channel from their coast via the Dogger Bank to the North Sea, which both the British and Germans pledged to keep safe. Nevertheless, Dutch sailors suffered from war-related incidents and neutrality violations. While both the initial German submarine campaign and the British did not formally target neutral trade, several Dutch ships were damaged or sunk by German U-boats and occasional stray Allied sea mines. 220 ships, 1189 sailors and fishermen were lost overall. The fishing town of Scheveningen lost 300 fishermen, out of a total of 862 Dutch fishermen lost and 96 to 175 fishing boats sunk. The majority was due to German attacks, with around 150 merchant and fishing ships sunk by U-boats, the largest being the passenger steamer SS Tubantia on 16 March 1916. Sea mines accounted for 19 deaths in Dutch waters, with some sea mines washing ashore and killing civilians or military specialists tasked with disarming them.

In February 1917 the Germans announced a renewed campaign of unrestricted submarine warfare with neutral ships bound for Britain now deliberately targeted. This meant that Dutch vessels proceeding to British ports for inspection were now under threat. As a result, the majority of Dutch shipping was left idle in port while the NOT attempted to negotiate with the Allies to relax the inspection requirement and allow their trade to bypass the German danger zone. In April 1917 the USA declared war against the Central Powers. The US adopted a hard line, restricting its own exports to neutrals. By June 1917, US authorities were detaining Dutch merchant ships in US ports. The Allies demanded the confiscation of such vessels in allied ports in return for loosening trade restrictions.

After lengthy negotiations the Dutch allowed an Allied ultimatum to lapse on 18 March 1918. The United States Customs Service seized 89 Dutch ships under angary, including 46 in New York. 31 of the ships that the US seized were commissioned into the United States Navy. Most were cargo ships, but they also included the ocean liners Rijndam, Koningin der Nederlanden, and Zeelandia, which the USA converted into troopships. Other Dutch cargo ships were taken over by the United States Shipping Board.

The United Kingdom also seized Dutch merchant ships, including Prinses Juliana and Goentoer, which were converted into troopships. In total the Allies requisitioned 132 ships, and they were returned in spring 1919. As punishment for allowing the seizure of the vessels, German leader Erich Ludendorff compelled the Dutch to allow the use of their railways and canals as "military highway". The Allies agreed to be more lenient towards the Netherlands while Germany declared that it would no longer recognise the neutrality of Dutch ships, and would sink them even outside the war zone.

=== Espionage ===
Its geographical significance and its international connections made the Netherlands become a hotbed of espionage. The country's neutrality allowed citizens of belligerent countries to travel freely to or from the Netherlands. Most spy agencies had operatives in the country. MI6 had a station in Rotterdam under the command of Richard B. Tinsley, who handled several important spy networks in Belgium, such as La Dame Blanche. The networks provided the Allies with intelligence concerning German troops behind the Western Front.

The German secret services also used Rotterdam as a base for espionage in Britain. From Rotterdam, spies were sent by ferry to spy on the Royal Navy.

Dutch citizens were in demand as spies, as they could travel freely throughout Europe. Some of the spies were executed for espionage. Haicke Janssen and Willem Roos, two unemployed Dutch sailors, were executed in 1915. The exotic dancer and courtesan Mata Hari, convicted of spying for Germany in France, was executed in 1917. In total, seven Dutch citizens were executed by the British, French and Germans, and many more were imprisoned.

== Armed forces ==
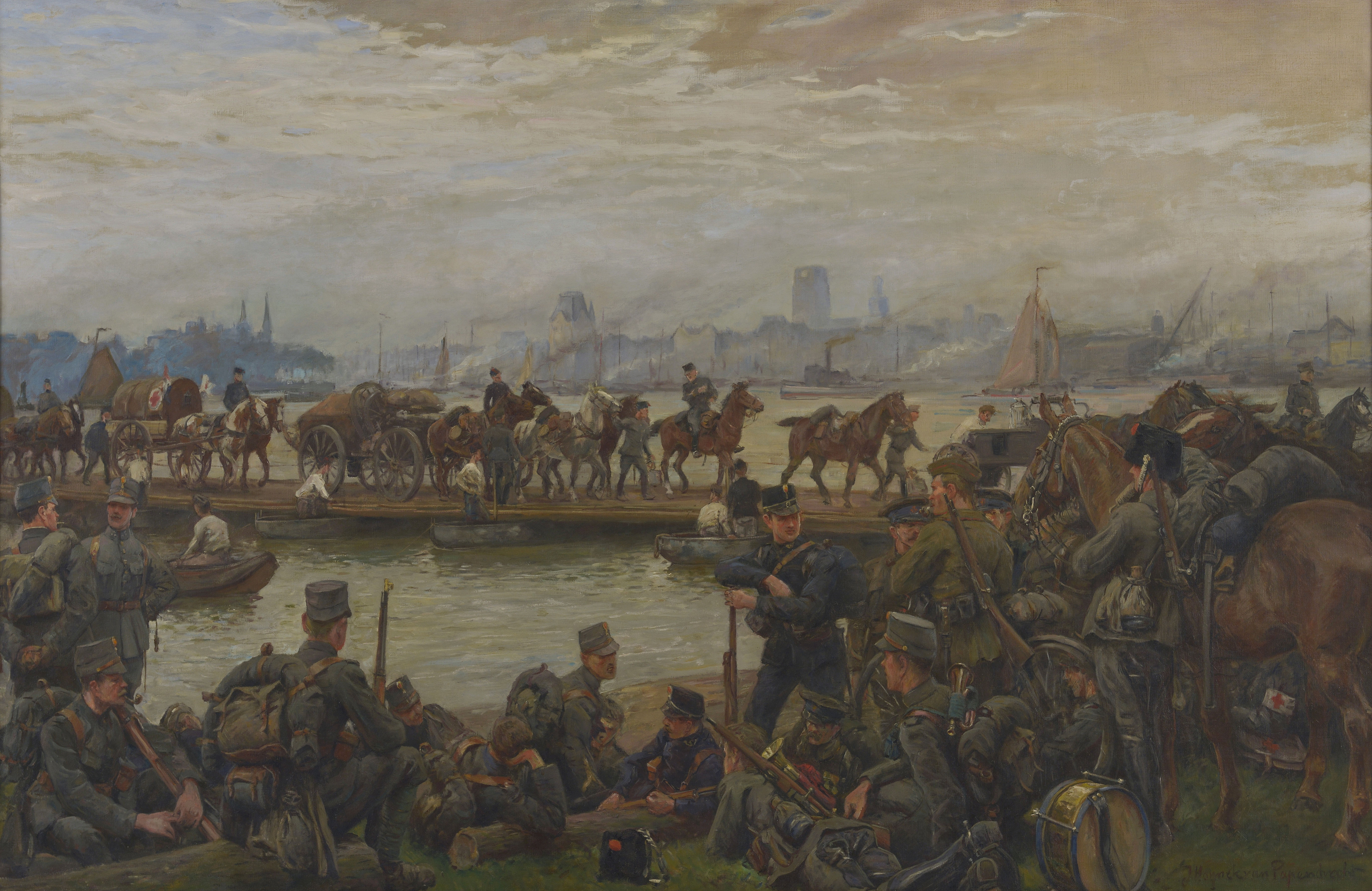
Oil painting of a military exercise during the war

On 31 July 1914, the Dutch government ordered the full mobilization of its conscript armed forces of 200,000 men, including reserves and regional militias. The chief of staff, Lieutenant-General Cornelis Snijders, was promoted to full general and commander-in-chief, a position that existed only in wartime. Snijders was the first non-aristocratic Dutch general to become commander-in-chief, which until then had been reserved for senior princes of the House of Orange.

The Dutch military strategy was purely defensive and rested on three pillars. First, there was the Dutch Water Line, a defensive ring of rivers and lowland surrounding the core Dutch region of Holland that could be inundated. An older version had existed since the 16th century. The second line of defence was formed by a circle of 19th-century fortresses and further inundations around the capital of Amsterdam. The third pillar was the Veldleger, or mobile field army, which would operate outside the Waterline in the rural eastern and southern provinces. In August 1914, the field army had an operational strength of 88,770 soldiers.

During the war, militarily sensitive border areas and places considered essential to national defense were declared to be in a state of siege, a status immediately below a state of war. There, military authorities ruled under martial law, and non-residents could travel there only with a special permit. The prohibited border areas were expanded during the war to fight espionage and to restrict the access of suspect individuals.

The main weapons used by the Dutch army were the Männlicher rifle and the Schwarzlose machine gun, both of which were manufactured in Austria-Hungary. Artillery weaponry was German and French but mostly outdated. The fortifications were also outdated.

At the start of the war, there was no air force, only a small aviation department within the army. During the war, foreign planes that crashed in Dutch territory were repaired to serve in the aviation department.

== Volunteers in foreign armies ==
Some Dutchmen volunteered for service in the French, British, German or Austro-Hungarian armies, but exact numbers are unknown. The Imperial German Army did not accept foreign volunteers unless they had German nationality, and they were often directed to the Austro-Hungarian, Bulgarian or Ottoman armies. Some immigrants from the Netherlands to Canada and a few who lived in the United States served with various regiments of the Canadian Expeditionary Force. About 80 of those who served have been identified through the personnel records of the First World War that are held at Library and Archives Canada.

== Refugees ==
After the German invasion of Belgium on 4 August 1914, one million Belgians out of a total population of six million fled their country to the Netherlands. The first wave consisted of Belgians of German descent, German-speaking East Europeans, and Jews, who fell victim to the Belgian public's outrage directly after the invasion. Many chose to leave because their businesses and homes were raided by angry mobs.

The second wave was caused by the German Army's invasion and war crimes against civilians. Most of these refugees returned when the focus of military action became concentrated on the Western Front, but others moved on to the UK or France. An estimated 100,000 Belgians stayed in refugee camps during the war, the largest of the camps being in Nunspeet. The Dutch-Belgian border was eventually blocked by the German-built Wire of Death.

As well as Belgian civilians, there were political refugees from Germany, such as the German-American socialist Carl Minster; Germans escaping conscription into the army; and prisoners-of-war who had escaped from German camps, mostly Russians, Ukrainians, and Poles.

== Foreign soldiers ==
=== Prisoners-of-war ===
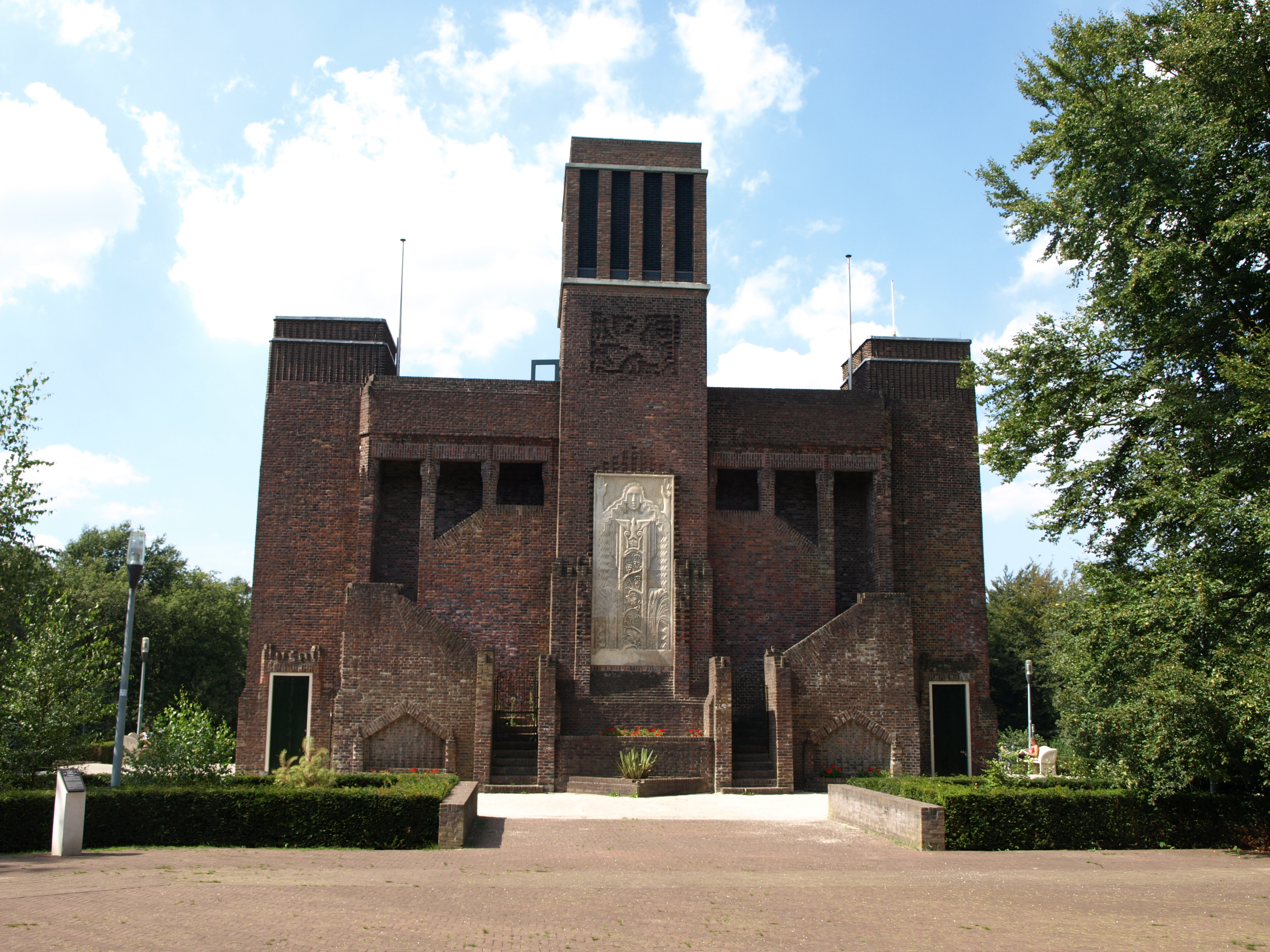
Commemorative monument to interned Belgian POWs

According to international law, soldiers of the warring nations who entered a neutral country were to be interned for the duration of the war. Of the soldiers who entered the Netherlands on purpose or by mistake, 33,105 were Belgians, 1,751 British, 1,461 Germans, 8 French and 4 Americans. Among the prisoners were pilots who had flown into Dutch airspace and crashed.

Most Belgian and British internees had fled to the Netherlands after the fall of Antwerp in 1914. Belgian prisoners were held captive in a camp in Amersfoort. The camp initially had a very strict regime, but after a revolt that resulted in the death of seven Belgians, the rules softened. As the prisoners would not be released until the end of the war, their wives and children often sought accommodation in the vicinity.

Most British prisoners-of-war were members of the 1st Royal Naval Brigade. They were interned in Groningen, where they were held captive under a mild regime, which allowed for trips into the city. Some British soldiers formed a cabaret group, named the Timbertown Follies, which toured throughout the country. The proceeds were donated to charities.

Many German soldiers entered the Netherlands by mistake, which occurred most frequently at the beginning of the war, as the border between the Netherlands and Belgium was confusing. The German prisoner-of-war camp was at Bergen, in the province of North Holland.

Deserters were not considered foreign soldiers when they entered neutral territory if they were unarmed, removed badges from their uniforms, and proclaimed themselves deserters to the proper authorities. Numbers are unknown, but most deserters by far were German. As deserters had no right to free accommodation or food, some of them were voluntarily interned in prisoner-of-war camps.

=== Edith Cavell ===
From 1914 to 1915, English nurse Edith Cavell, who was based in German-occupied Belgium, helped 200 Allied soldiers escape from Belgian soil to the Netherlands. Wounded Allied soldiers as well as Belgian and French civilians of military age were hidden from German occupational troops and provided with false papers by Prince Réginald de Croÿ at Bellignies, his château near Mons, Belgium. From there, they were conducted by various guides to the houses of Cavell and others in Brussels, where their hosts furnished them with money to reach the Belgium-Netherlands border and provide them with guides. With their false papers, the soldiers were able to evade the Dutch authorities and avoid being interned, and several eventually made their way to Britain. On 3 August 1915, Cavell was arrested by the Germans and court-martialed and sentenced to death for violating German military law, and was executed by firing squad on 12 October. Her execution provoked outrage among both the Allies and neutral countries, and was represented as an act of German barbarism and moral depravity in British propaganda.

== Economic consequences ==
It has been argued that the Netherlands overall profited from its neutral position during the war. Estimates of per-capita, inflation adjusted economic growth between 1913 and 1921 are 2.4 percent, higher than the western Allies, Germany, and most neutral powers, but not the US. War conditions, however, did disrupt the Netherlands' food imports (due to U-boat attacks and Allied embargoes) and the failure of authorities to prevent food producers from prioritizing the lucrative export trade over domestic consumption led to further shortages.

A number of food riots occurred. In June–July 1917 there were food riots in Amsterdam. Rioters broke into warehouses and took potatoes that were intended to be exported to the UK. Two thousand soldiers were called in to break up the riot. The revolt was ended when soldiers opened fire on the crowd. In total 9 were killed. Later, fearing a revolution led by socialist leader Pieter Jelles Troelstra, Dutch would adopt a strongly pro-Allied policy under the September 1918 Beerenbrouck government. The Allies permitted the export to the Dutch of large quantities of grain, relieving the food issue.

== See also ==
- Netherlands in World War II
