= Angary =

Law of war legal terminology

The right of angary is the right of a belligerent (most commonly, a government or other party in conflict) to seize and use, for the purposes of war or to prevent the enemy from doing so, any kind of property on belligerent territory, including what may belong to subjects or citizens of a neutral state.

Article 53 of the regulations respecting the "Laws and Customs of War on Land", annexed to the Hague Convention of 1899 on the same subject, provides that railway plant, land telegraphs, telephones, steamers and other ships (other than such as are governed by maritime law), though belonging to companies or private persons, may be used for military operations but "must be restored at the conclusion of peace and indemnities paid for them". Article 54 adds that "the plant of railways coming from neutral states, whether the property of those states or of companies or private persons, shall be sent back to them as soon as possible."

The articles seem to sanction the right of angary against neutral property and to limit it as against both belligerent and neutral property. It may be considered, however, that the right to use implies as wide a range of contingencies as the "necessity of war" can be made to cover.

== See also ==
- Eminent domain
- Perfidy
