= HNLMS K 3 =

HNLMS K 3 (Dutch: Hr.Ms. K 3) may refer to one of three ships of the Royal Netherlands Navy named K 3 or K III:

- HNLMS K3 (1905), a K-class torpedo boat, later Willem Warmont
- HNLMS K III (1920), a K III-class patrol submarine
- HNLMS K3 (1941), K-class sloop, captured by the Germans and commissioned in to the Kriegsmarine. Repaired after the war and returned to Dutch service as frigate Van Speijk
