= HNLMS K 2 =

HNLMS K 2 (Dutch: Hr.Ms. K 2) may refer to one of three ships of the Royal Netherlands Navy named K 2 or K II:

- HNLMS K2 (1905), a K-class torpedo boat, later Christiaan Cornelis
- HNLMS K II (1919), a unique submarine
- HNLMS K2 (1941), K-class sloop, captured by the Germans and commissioned in to the Kriegsmarine
