= HNLMS K 1 =

HNLMS K 1 (Dutch: Hr.Ms. K 1) may refer to one of three ships of the Royal Netherlands Navy named K 1 or K I:

- HNLMS K1 (1905), a K-class torpedo boat, later Michiel Gardeyn
- HNLMS K I (1914), a unique submarine
- HNLMS K1 (1941), K-class sloop, captured by the Germans and commissioned in to the Kriegsmarine
