= HNLMS Jacob van Heemskerck =

HNLMS Jacob van Heemskerck (Dutch: Hr.Ms. or Zr.Ms. Jacob van Heemskerck) may refer to the following ships of the Royal Netherlands Navy:

- HNLMS Jacob van Heemskerck (1906), a unique pantserschip (coastal defence ship)
- HNLMS Jacob van Heemskerck (1939), a Tromp-class cruiser
- HNLMS Jacob van Heemskerck (1983), a Jacob van Heemskerck-class frigate
