= F805 =

F805 may refer to:

- HNLMS Van Speijk (K3), a K-class sloop designed for the Royal Netherlands Navy in the late 1930s
- HNLMS Van Nes (F805), a Van Speijk-class frigate built for the Royal Netherlands Navy in the 1960s
- HNLMS Evertsen (F805), a De Zeven Provinciën-class frigate of the Royal Netherlands Navy, launched in 2003
