= G-class torpedo boat =

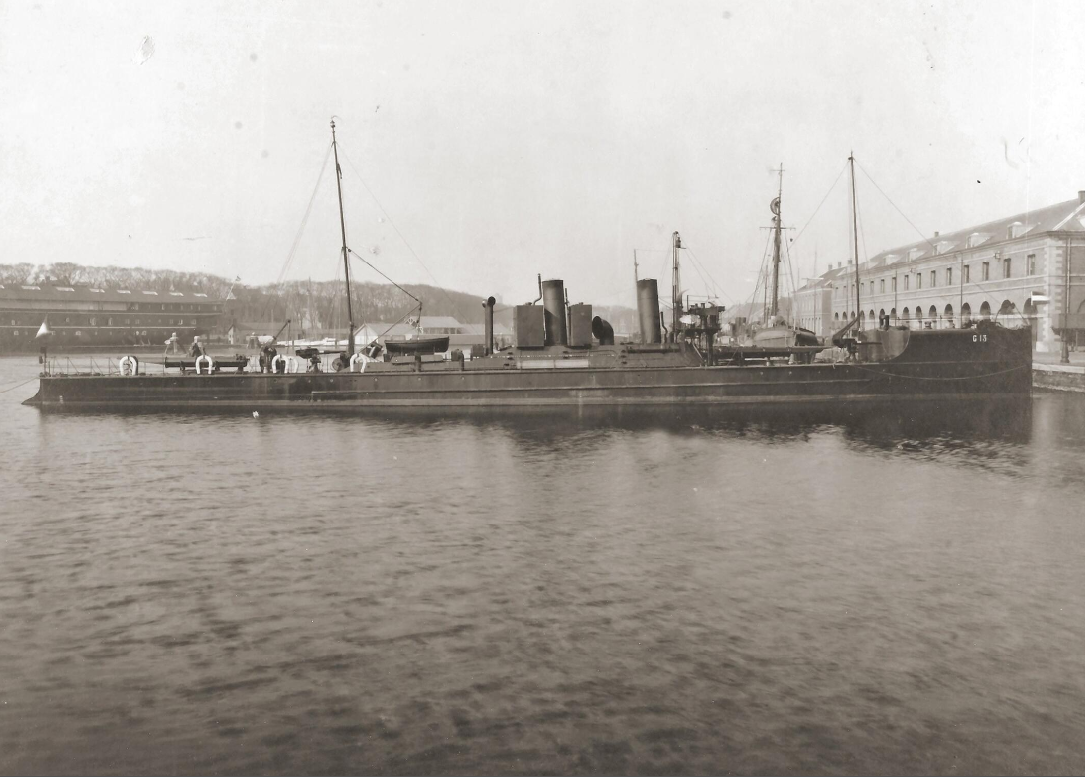
- Dutch torpedo boat G13

Class overview
- Name: G class
- Operators: Royal Netherlands Navy
- Subclasses: 4
- In commission: 1904–1945
- Planned: 16
- Building: 16
- Completed: 16
- Lost: 2
- Retired: 14

General characteristics
- Type: Torpedo boat
- Displacement: G1, G3 and G7 subclasses: 140 t (140 long tons); 180 t (180 long tons) (full load); G13 subclass: 180 t (180 long tons); 230 t (230 long tons) (full load)
- Length: 49.5 m (162 ft 5 in)
- Beam: 5.2 m (17 ft 1 in)
- Draught: 2.9 m (9 ft 6 in)
- Installed power: 3,000 hp (2,200 kW)
- Propulsion: 2 boilers and 2 shafts
- Speed: 26 knots (48 km/h; 30 mph)
- Complement: 27
- Armament: 2 × single 75 mm (3 in) L/30 Bofors No. 4 guns; 2 × single .50 machine guns; 3 × single 450 mm (18 in) torpedo tubes

The G class was a series of sixteen torpedo boats built for the Royal Netherlands Navy. The class sat in size between the smaller K class (K meaning Klein - Dutch for small) and the larger Z class (Z meaning Zeer groot - Dutch for very large). The G class (G meaning Groot - Dutch for large) comprised four subclasses: the G1, G3, G7, and G13. All ships served during the First World War.

The class was considered obsolete and worn out by the time the second World War broke out. This directly resulted in these ships not seeing much action.

== Construction ==
Name	Laid down	Launched	Commissioned	Decommissioned
G1 "Johan van Brakel"	1903	1903	1904	1919
G2	1903	1903	1904	1919
G3	1903	1903	1904	1919
G4 "Willem Willemsze"	1903	1904	7 December 1904	1919
G5 "Roemer Vlacq"	1905	1906	1906	1919
G6 "Pieter Constant"	1905	1906	1 November 1906	1919
G7	1905	1905	1906	1919
G8 "Cornelis Janssen de Haan"	1905	1906	8 October 1906	1919
G9	1907	1907	1908	1919
G10	1908	1908	1908	1919
G11	1908	1909	1909	1918 after striking a mine
G12	1909	1909	1909	1919
G13	5 March 1913	18 October 1913	11 March 1914	February 1943
G14	May 1913	December 1913	June 1914	January 1919
G15	10 June 1913	3 January 1914	3 August 1914	February 1943
G16	22 July 1913	10 March 1914	29 July 1914	14 May 1940 Royal Netherlands Navy 3 May 1945 Kriegsmarine

== Service history ==
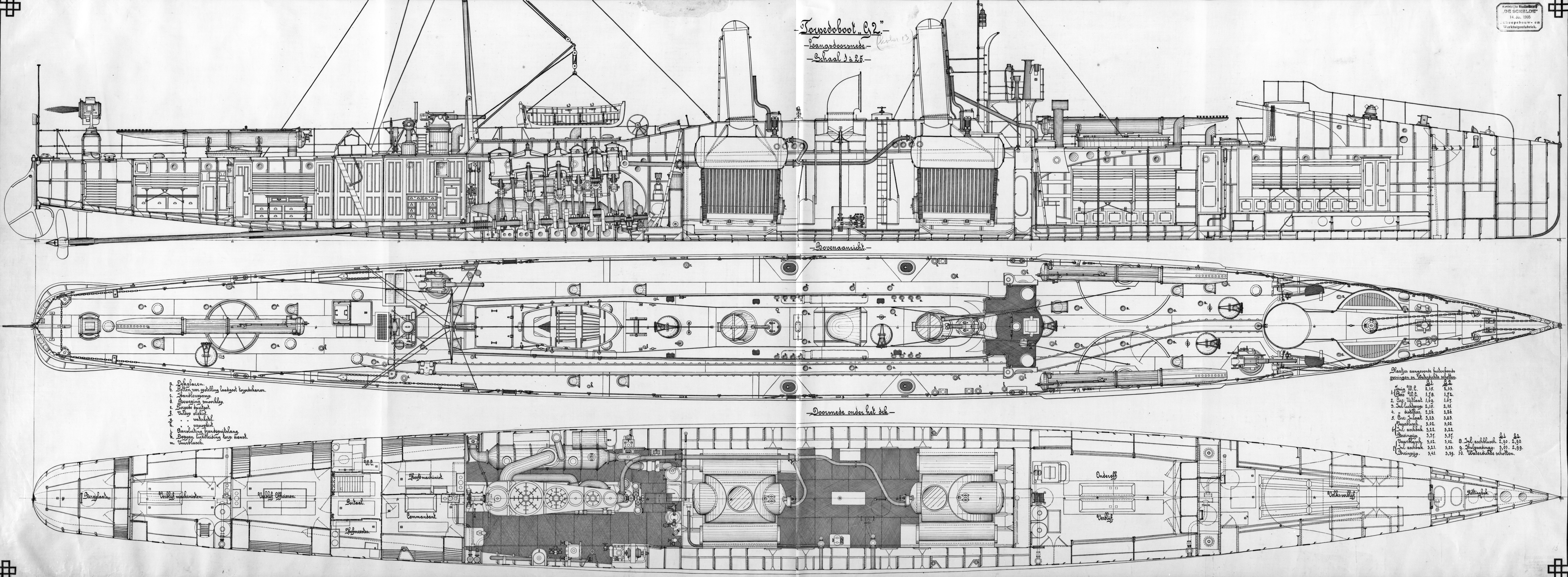
G02 plan

The G1, G3 and G7 subclasses were nearly identical. Only the G13 subclass was significantly different in that it was redesigned with full oceangoing capabilities in mind. This design would later serve as inspiration for the Z-class torpedoboats that came after. The boats G1 to G8 had all received names in addition to their G-number, their official names would however remain the G-numbers.

G1 to G12 were all retired in 1919 as they were considered obsolete at that time, with the exception of G11 which was decommissioned a year prior after hitting a mine left over from the First World War. G14 was also retired in 1919 after a boiler explosion in drydock in Vlissingen on January 11th.

By May 1940 the Second World War broke out for the Netherlands. At that time, G13, G15, and G16 were still in service. G13 and G15 managed to escape to the United Kingdom where they performed some escort and patrol duties until being decommissioned as they were considered obsolete and unfit for service due to their age.

G16 was scuttled in Den Helder. The vessel was raised and repaired and was commissioned into the Kriegsmarine as the torpedo recovery vessel TFA-9. She was sunk at Kiel at the end of the war in Europe and returned to the Netherlands where she was expended as a target ship in 1948.
