= HNLMS Tromp (1937) =

Dutch naval destroyer (1938–1955)

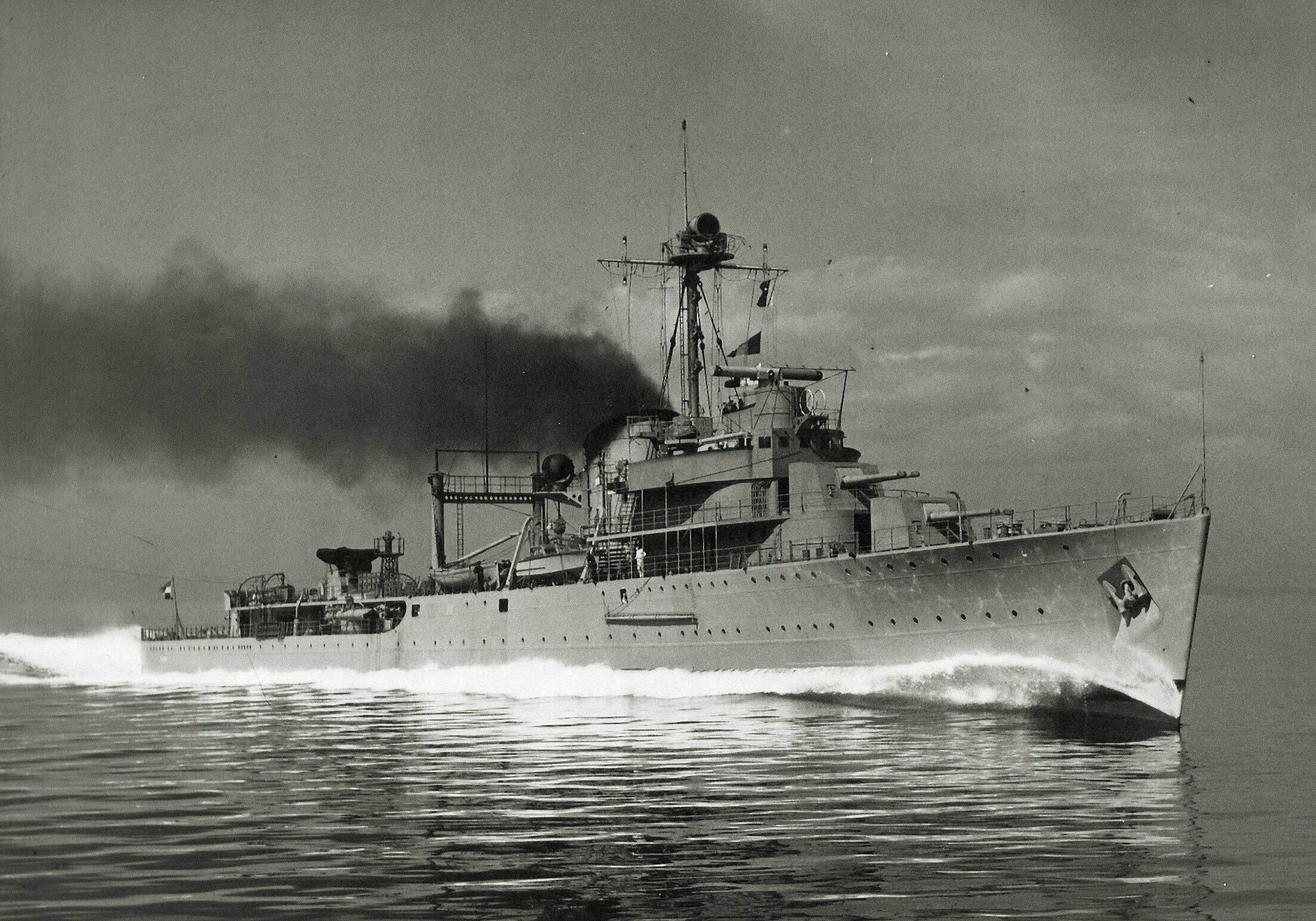
- Tromp in 1938

History

Netherlands
- Name: Tromp
- Namesake: Admiral Maarten Tromp
- Builder: Nederlandsche Scheepsbouw Mij., Amsterdam
- Laid down: 17 January 1936
- Launched: 24 May 1937
- Commissioned: 18 August 1938
- Decommissioned: 1 April 1955
- Identification: D-28 (1940s); KL-2 (1946); C804 (1950); A878 (1955)
- Fate: Scrapped 1969

General characteristics
- Class & type: Tromp-class destroyer leader
- Displacement: 3,400 long tons (3,455 t) standard
- Length: 132 m (433 ft 1 in)
- Beam: 12.4 m (40 ft 8 in)
- Draught: 4.8 m (15 ft 9 in)
- Propulsion: 2 Parsons geared steam turbines; 4 Yarrow boilers; 2 shafts; 56,000 shp (41,759 kW)
- Speed: 33 knots (38 mph; 61 km/h)
- Complement: 295–380
- Armament: 6 × 150 mm (5.9 in) guns (3×2); 4 × 75 mm; 8 × 40 mm (4×2); 2 × 20 mm; 6 × 533 mm (21 in) torpedo tubes (2×3)
- Armour: Deck: 1.5–2.5 in (38–64 mm); Belt: 1.5 in (38 mm)
- Aircraft carried: 1 × Fokker C.XIW floatplane

HNLMS Tromp was the lead ship of the Tromp-class destroyer leaders built for the Royal Netherlands Navy. Built just prior to World War II, the ship served mainly in the Pacific and Indian Oceans against the Japanese, being based out of Sydney, Fremantle and Trincomalee where she served alongside British, Australian and US warships. After the war, she returned to the Netherlands; after 1949, Tromp was used as a training and accommodation ship, before being decommissioned in 1955, and scrapped in 1969.

== Design and description ==
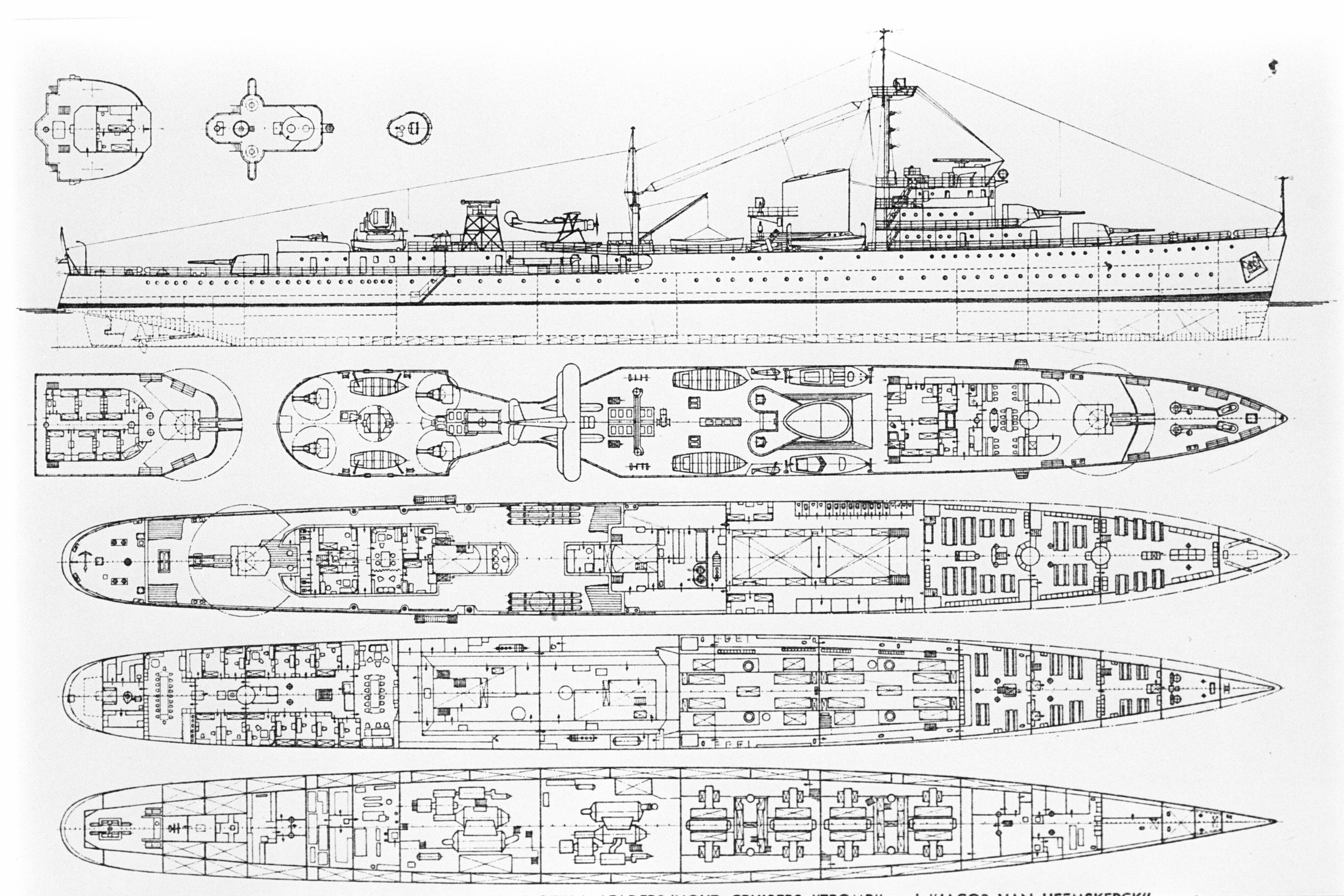
Sectional view and deck layout of Tromp.

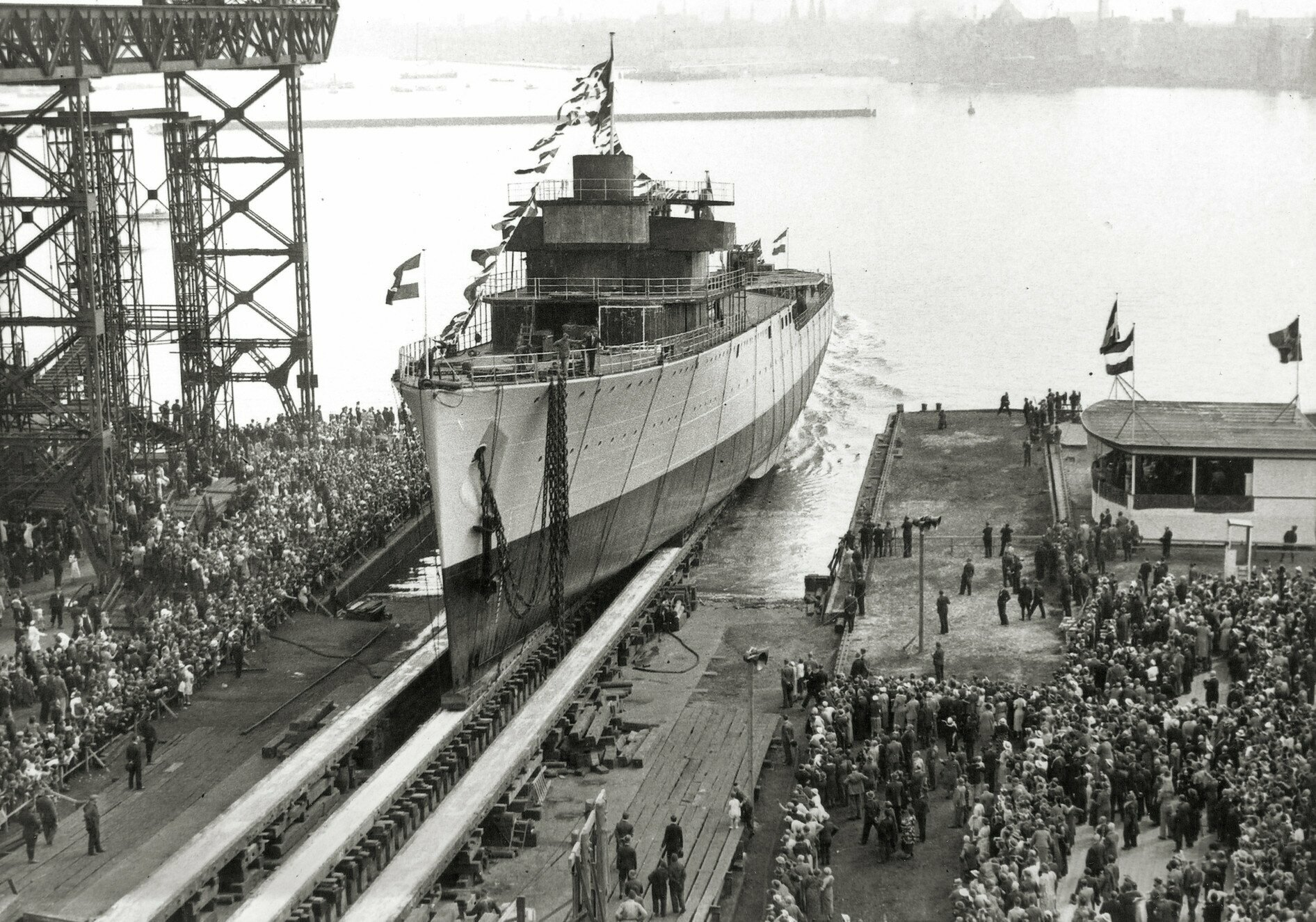
Launch ceremony in 1937

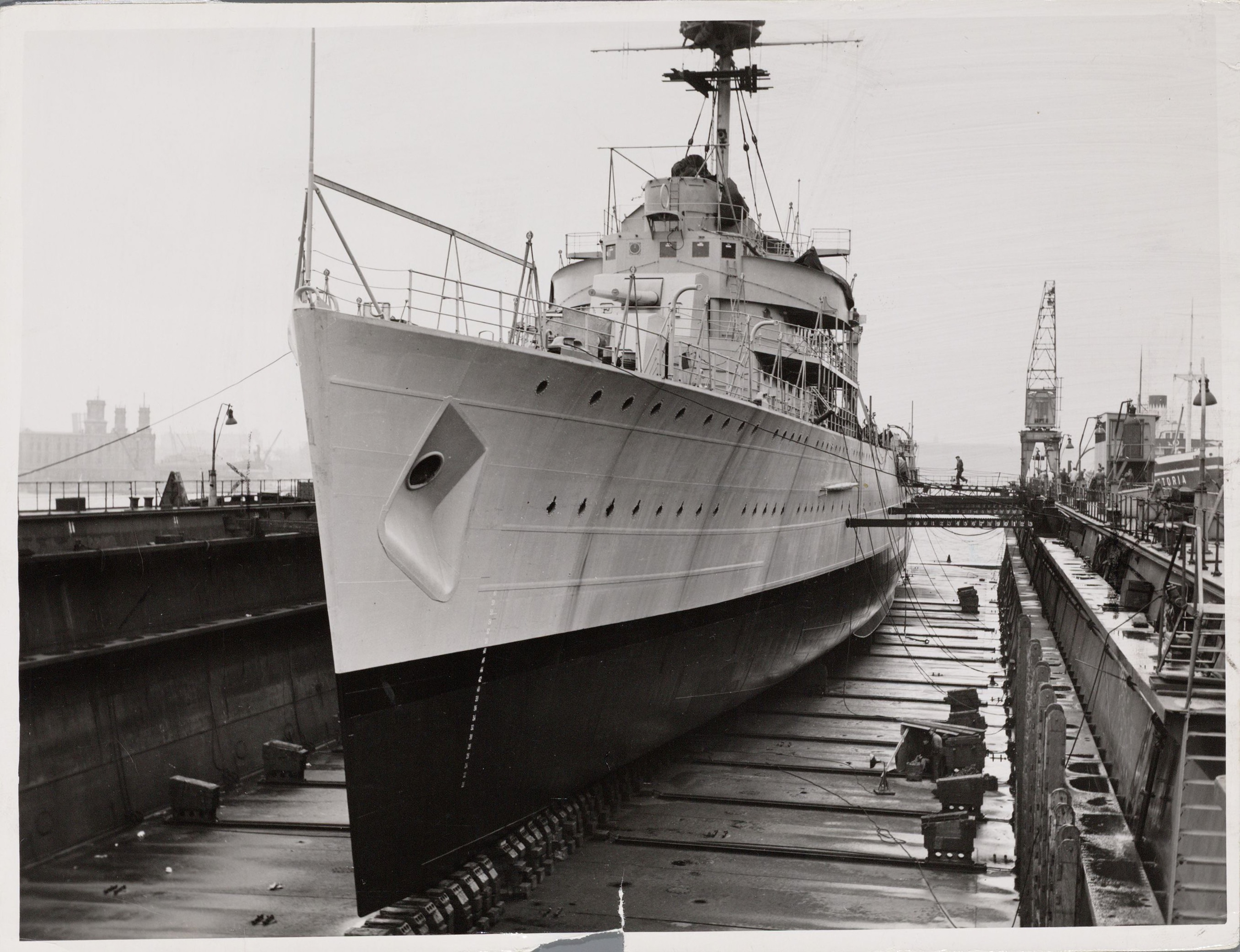
On Juliana Drydock

Originally designated as a flotilla leader in the Deckers Fleet Plan of 1931, Tromp was ordered in 1935 and laid down at the Nederlandsche Scheepsbouw Maatschappij (Netherlands Shipbuilding Company), in Amsterdam, on 17 January 1936.

Tromp was launched on 24 May 1937. She was named after Admirals Maarten Tromp and Cornelis Tromp. Tromp was then finished while afloat. On 8 February 1938, Tromp was lifted Juliana Drydock. Amongst other jobs, her propellers were installed here. Tromp was commissioned into the Royal Netherlands Navy on 18 August 1938.

Tromp was 132 m (433 ft 1 in) long, had a beam of 12.4 m (40 ft 8 in) and a draught of 4.8 m (15 ft 9 in). She displaced 3,450 tons at standard load with 860 tons of bunkerage. Powered by two Parsons geared steam turbines, with four Yarrow boilers that drove two shafts and produced 56,000 shp (41,759 kW), she was capable of achieving a maximum speed of 32.5 knots (37.4 mph; 60.2 km/h). Upon construction, the ship's complement was 295, although this later increased to 380.

Her armament consisted of six 150 mm (5.9 in) guns twin-mounted in three turrets, as well as two twin-mounted 40 mm Bofors guns. As built, she also had two twin-mounted .50 calibre machine guns, although these were later replaced with two single-mounted 20 mm Oerlikons. In addition, for anti-aircraft defence, she was later fitted out with an extra six 20 mm Oerlikon machine guns, four US-made 75 mm guns and four more 40 mm Bofors. She also carried six 533 mm (21 in) torpedo tubes in two banks of three, and was equipped with a Fokker C.XIW floatplane. Her anti-submarine features included ASDIC, a hydrophone, and four depth-charge throwers. Her deck armour was 1.5–2.5 in (38–64 mm), while her side belt armour was 1.5 in (38 mm). Upon her commissioning, Tromp was one of the most powerful ships in the Dutch navy.

== Service history ==
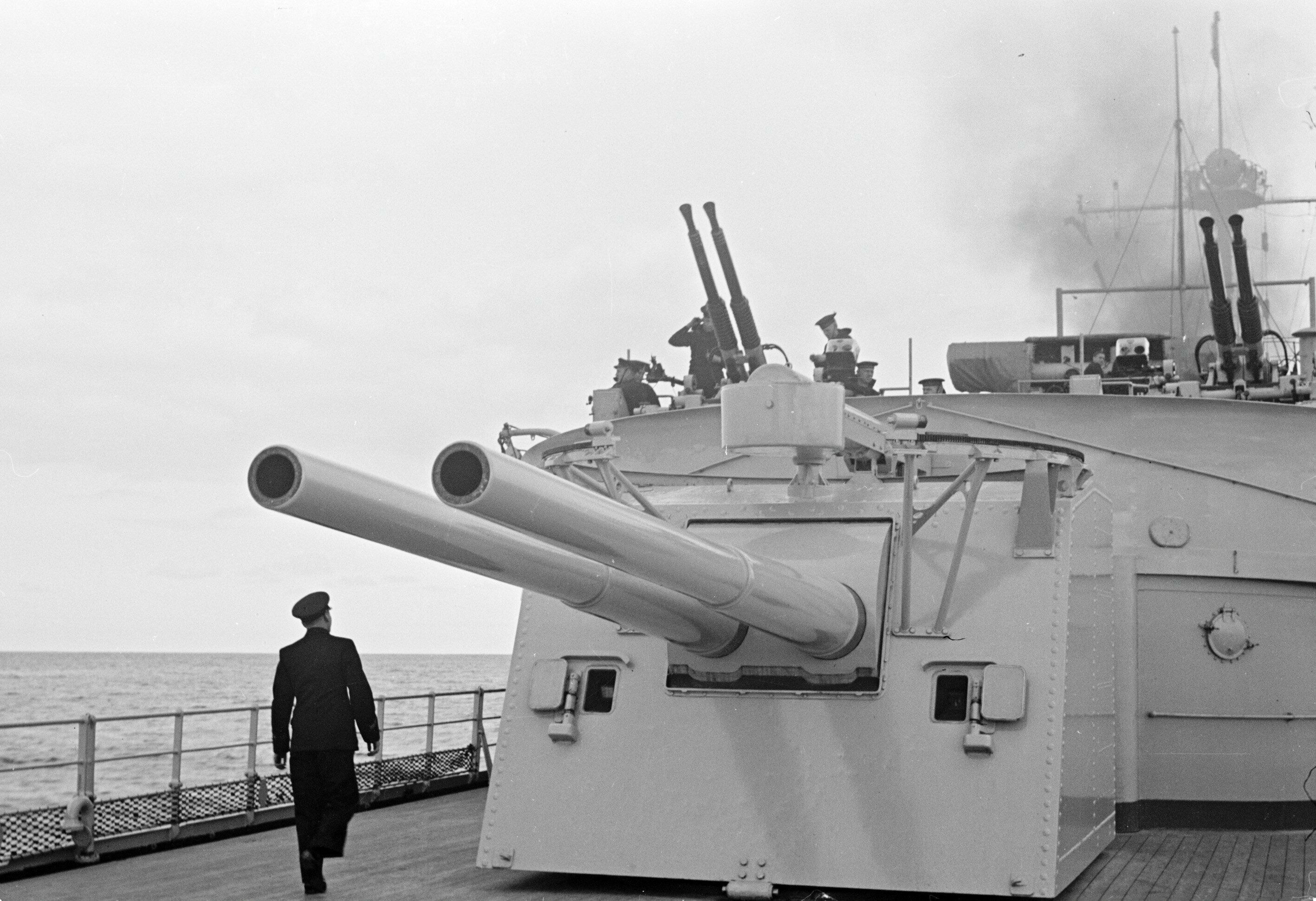
A closer view of one of the main gun turrets and anti-aircraft armament on Tromp.

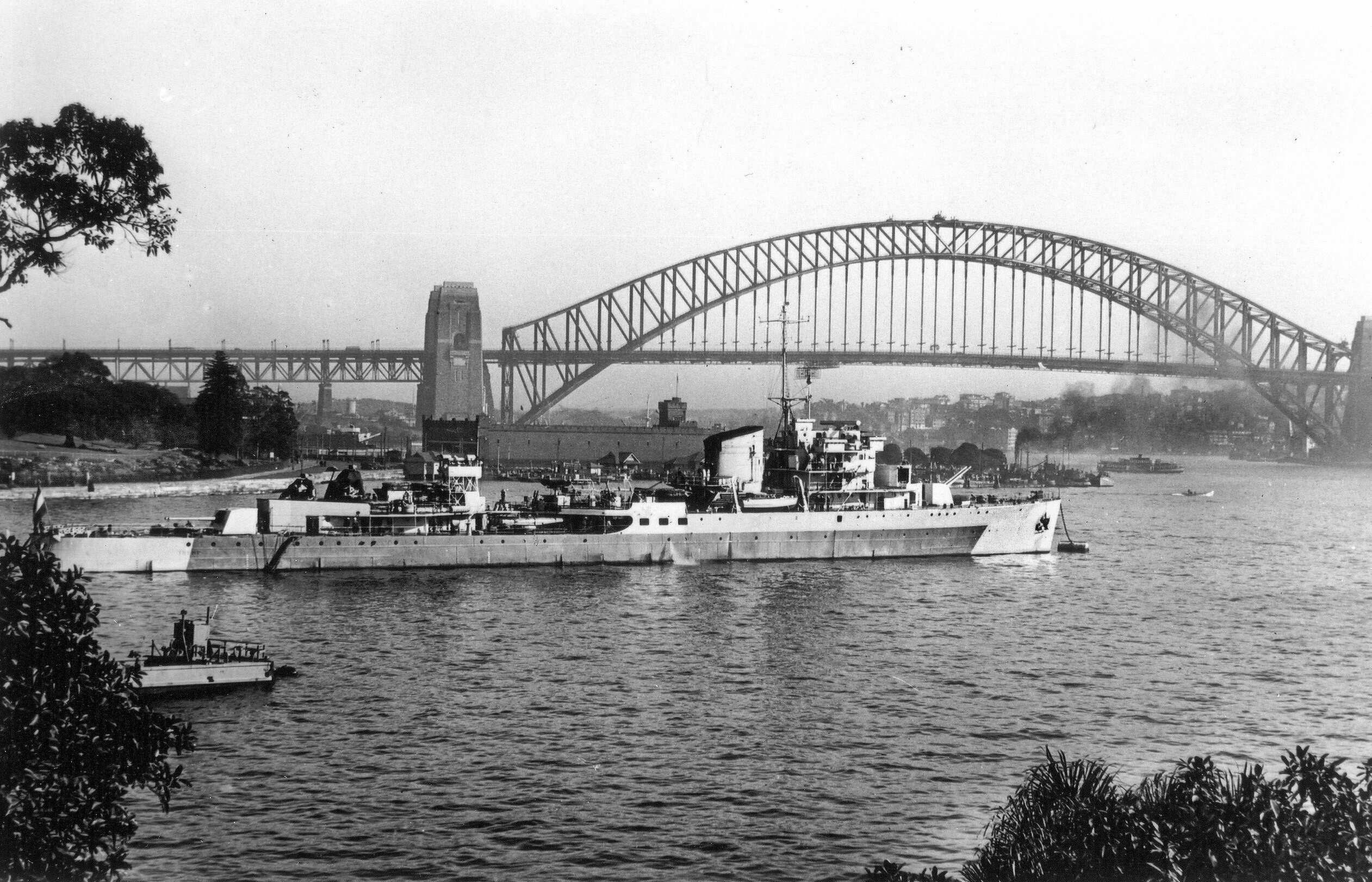
HNLMS Tromp in Sydney, 1944, wearing Measure 22 camouflage

Following her commissioning, Tromp carried out working up manoeuvres until early January 1939 when she departed Rotterdam, bound for the Mediterranean. Transiting via Lisbon, in Portugal, on 15 January, she was lightly damaged when she accidentally collided with the German passenger ship Orinoco. She returned to the Netherlands in April to take part in the fleet review at Scheveningen, before participating in a cruise to Norway, where she stopped over at Oslo. In July 1939, Commander J. W. Termijtelen took over command of the ship from Captain L.A.C.M. Doorman and under Termijtelen's command the ship sailed for the Netherlands East Indies in August 1939, arriving just after the outbreak of World War II in Europe.

In mid-September 1939, the ship searched several German merchantmen in Padang, before proceeding to Surabaya for a refit. Throughout 1940, the ship undertook patrol and escort duties as part of the Netherlands East Indies Squadron before escorting ships of the Java–New York Line in a convoy to the Gilbert Islands in early 1941. A new captain, Commander J.B. de Meester, arrived in July. In the final months of 1941, tensions in the region began to heighten amidst concerns about war with Japan and in November 1941 Tromp was involved in searches of Vichy French merchant vessels operating in the area. In late November and early December 1941, Tromp moved to the western Java Sea to help search for HMAS Sydney, which was missing after encountering the German raider Kormoran.

Following the outbreak of fighting against the Japanese in the Pacific, she was assigned to the Combined Striking Force, ABDA Command, in January 1942 for the defence of the East Indies. Tromp was badly damaged off Bali on 18 February 1942 during the Battle of Badung Strait, when she was hit by eleven 5-inch (127 mm) shells from the Japanese destroyer Asashio. Her return fire hit two Japanese destroyers, killing four men on Asashio and seven on Ōshio. The ship was then sent to Australia for repairs in February 1942, sailing firstly to Fremantle and then on to Sydney.

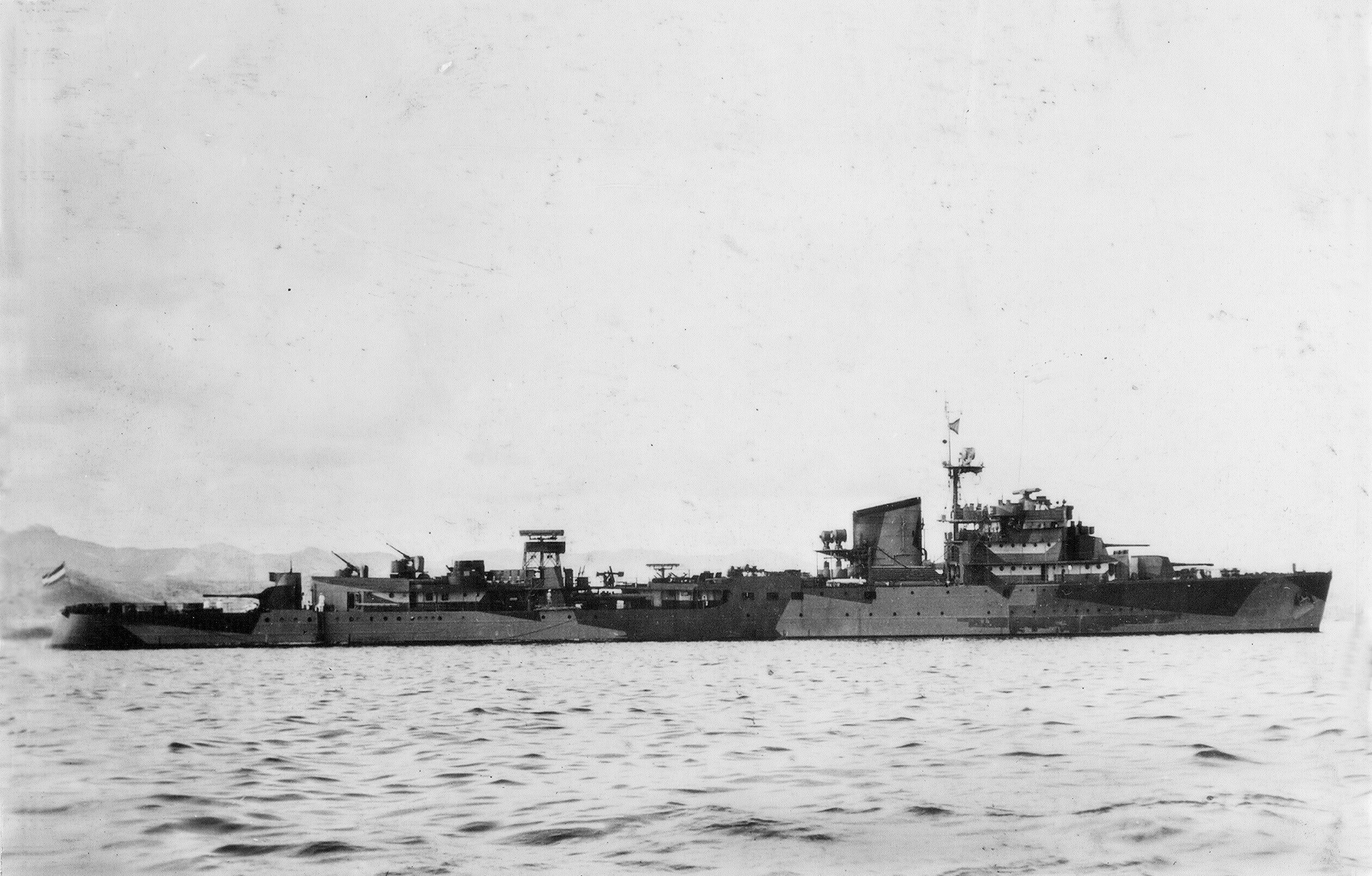
The camouflaged Tromp operating out of Australia sometime between 1943 and 1944.

Repairs were completed by May 1942, at which time she began a period of sea trials. These were interrupted by anti-submarine patrols off Newcastle in the middle of the month after the Soviet steamer Wellen was attacked, but these patrols proved uneventful. On 18 May 1942, in company with HMAS Arunta, Tromp escorted convoy "ZK.8" out of Sydney composed of the Dutch ships Bantam, Bontekoe, Van Heemskerk and Van Heutsz bound for Port Moresby with 4,735 troops of the Australian 14th Brigade. Afterwards, Tromp escorted several more north-bound convoys before completing its sea trials in early June. The following month she departed Sydney bound for Fremantle, escorting a westward-bound convoy. She remained in Fremantle until October 1942 when the ship returned to Sydney to replace her radar. Upon completion, she undertook a visit to New Zealand before returning to Fremantle at the end of the year in concert with a British troopship, Nestor.

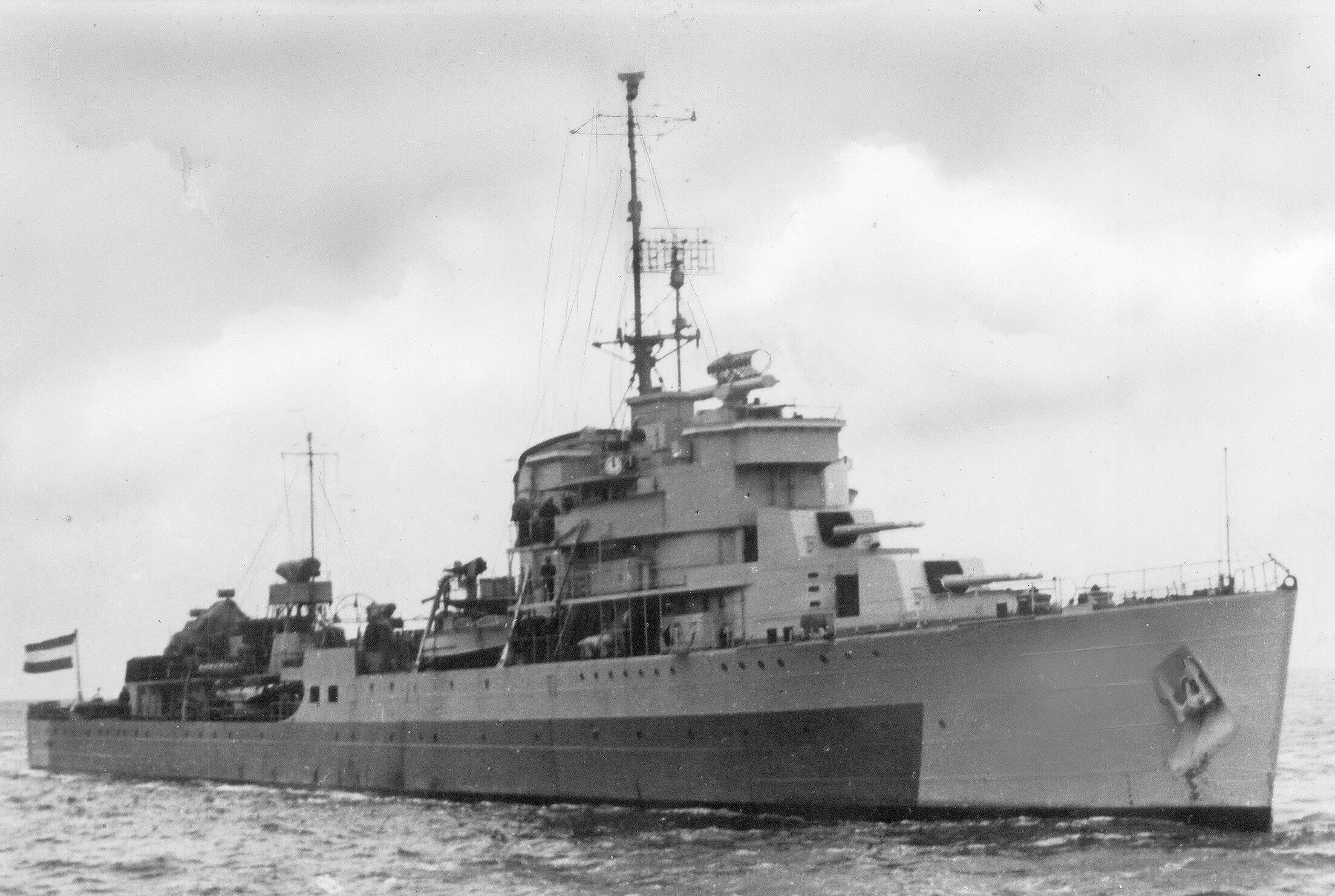
Tromp in 1945

In February 1943, while based out of Fremantle, Tromp was assigned to the US Seventh Fleet, tasked with conducting convoy escort around Australia and in the Indian Ocean. Throughout the year, Tromp undertook further convoy escorts until October when Commander F. Stam arrived to take over command. In January 1944, Tromp was assigned to the British Eastern Fleet based at Colombo, in Ceylon. A short time later, she was transferred to the fleet base at Trincomalee. The ship then participated in raids on Sabang in April and Surabaya in May 1944, undertaking escort duty in between. She transferred to Sydney for a refit in September 1944, remaining there until February 1945, when Tromp returned to Trincomalee to undertake further escort duty. In the final months of the war, Tromp was part of the Allied fleet that bombarded Japanese positions prior to the Australian 7th Division's landing at Balikpapan during operations to recapture Borneo from the Japanese.

Following the end of the hostilities, Tromp was assigned to the British Pacific Fleet and in September 1945 deployed to Jakarta where she landed marines who re-occupied the governor's residence as Allied forces arrived to disarm the Japanese garrison. She then ferried liberated Dutch prisoners-of-war between Singapore, Bangkok and Sydney during the final months of the year. She remained in Sydney until February 1946 when she sailed for the Netherlands to return over 150 former prisoners-of-war. Upon her return to the Netherlands in May 1946, the ship underwent a significant refit which lasted until mid-1948. From 1949, Tromp was used mainly as a training or accommodation ship, before being decommissioned in 1955 and scrapped in 1969.
