= Tromp-class cruiser =

Class of flotilla leaders of the Royal Netherlands Navy

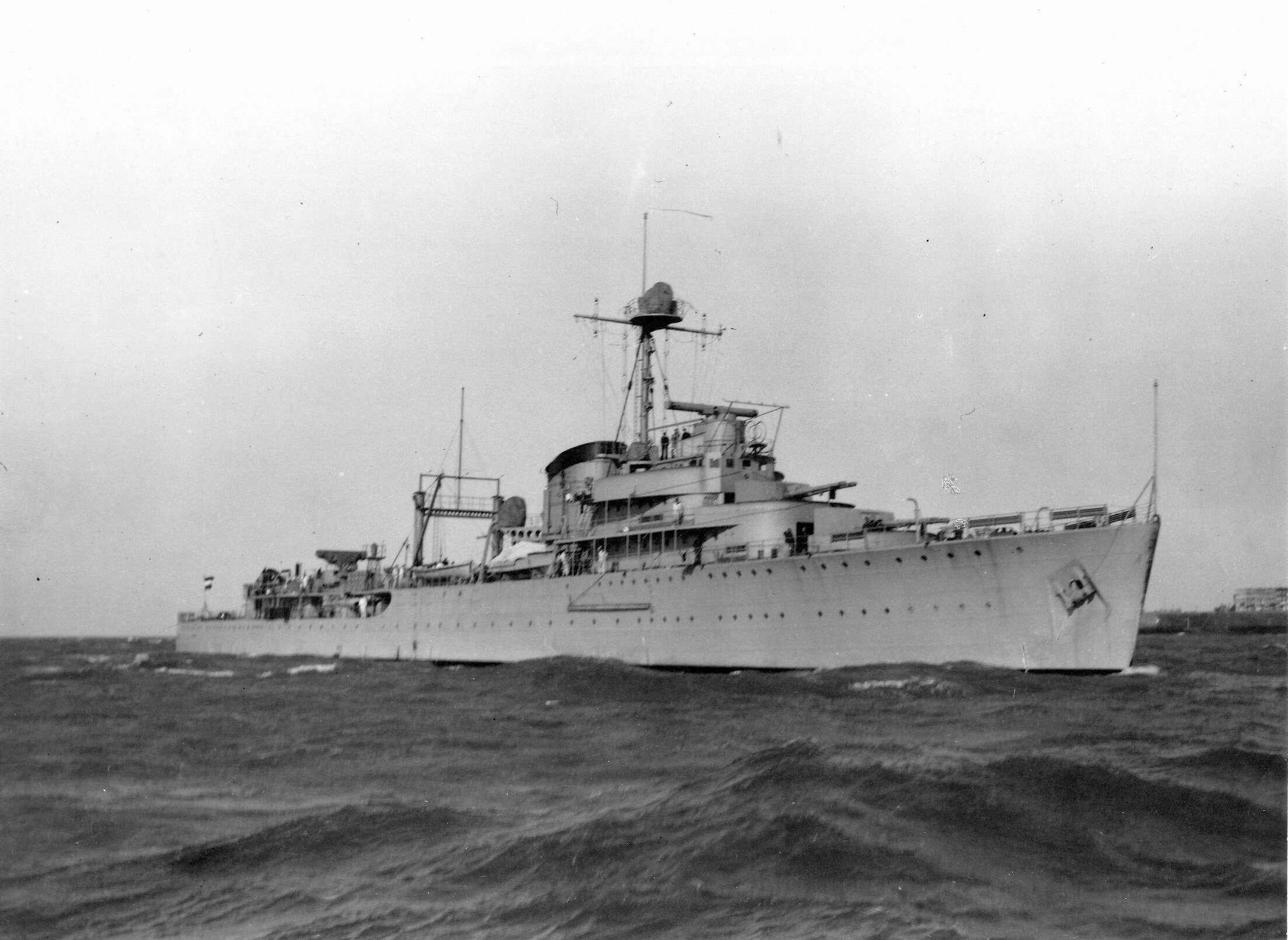
- Lead of her class Tromp c. 1938

Class overview
- Name: Tromp class
- Builders: Nederlandsche Scheepsbouw Mij
- Operators: Royal Netherlands Navy
- Built: 1936–1940
- In commission: 1938–1969
- Planned: 2
- Completed: 2
- Retired: 2

General characteristics
- Type: Flotilla leader or light cruiser
- Displacement: 3,787 long tons (3,848 t)
- Length: 131.9 m (433 ft)
- Beam: 12.4 m (41 ft)
- Draught: 4.6 m (15 ft)
- Installed power: 56,000 shp (42,000 kW)
- Propulsion: 2 geared steam turbines; 4 boilers; 2 shafts
- Speed: 34.5 knots (63.9 km/h; 39.7 mph) achieved; 33.5 knots (38.6 mph; 62.0 km/h) design
- Armament: Tromp (at launch): 6 × 150 mm (5.9 in) (3×2); 4 × 40 mm (2×2); 6 × 533 mm (21 in) torpedo tubes (2×3); 4 × 1.3 cm (.5 in) (2×2); Jacob van Heemskerk (after conversion to AA cruiser): 10 × 102 mm (4 in) guns (5×2); 6 × 20 mm (0.79 in); 1 × QF 2-pounder (1×4)
- Armour: 15–25 mm (0.59–0.98 in) main deck; 16–25 mm (0.63–0.98 in) second deck; 16 mm (0.63 in) turrets; 13 mm (0.51 in) conning tower
- Aircraft carried: 1 × Fokker C.XIW floatplane (Tromp)

The Tromp-class was a two-ship series of light cruisers operated by the Royal Netherlands Navy between 1939 and 1969. Officially designated as flotilla leaders, the ships were built to also operate as torpedo and scout cruisers. The two ships, Tromp and Jacob van Heemskerck, were intended to defend the Dutch East Indies against Japan. By the start of World War II, only Tromp was in service: the uncompleted Heemskerck fled to the United Kingdom and was converted into an air-defense cruiser following the Invasion of the Netherlands. The two ships operated with either British or American fleets throughout Asia for the rest of the war, and participated in Allied offensives throughout the Indonesian Archipelago and western Pacific. During the early Cold War, the ships participated in several fleet maneuvers before they were reassigned as training ships and decommissioned in the late 1960s.

== Development ==
During the Interwar period, the Dutch Navy was split between defending the Netherlands and the Dutch East Indies, particularly the island of Java. While the European fleet focused around minelaying, the flotilla in Asia relied on a combination of aircraft, destroyers, and submarines to identify and destroy an invading force near the coastline. Cruisers were vital in this doctrine, as they had the capability to sail out to sea and attack enemy convoys outside the Indonesian archipelago and serve as powerful escorts for allied vessels.

By 1927, the Great Depression had sapped the budget and strength of the Dutch military. Recognizing the need for post-depression rebuilding, the Navy proposed the Vlootplan Deckers (Deckers Fleet Plan) in 1930 to expand the East Indies fleet to a satisfactory size. The plan included two additional light cruisers, described as torpedo cruisers and scout cruisers, intended to operate as flotilla leaders. The two ships were envisioned as a fiscally efficient response to the Japanese Fubuki-class destroyers that outmatched comparable Dutch destroyers. doctrine called for the two ships to be fast enough to lead destroyers in combat while being armed well enough to overpower Japanese cruisers and destroyers.

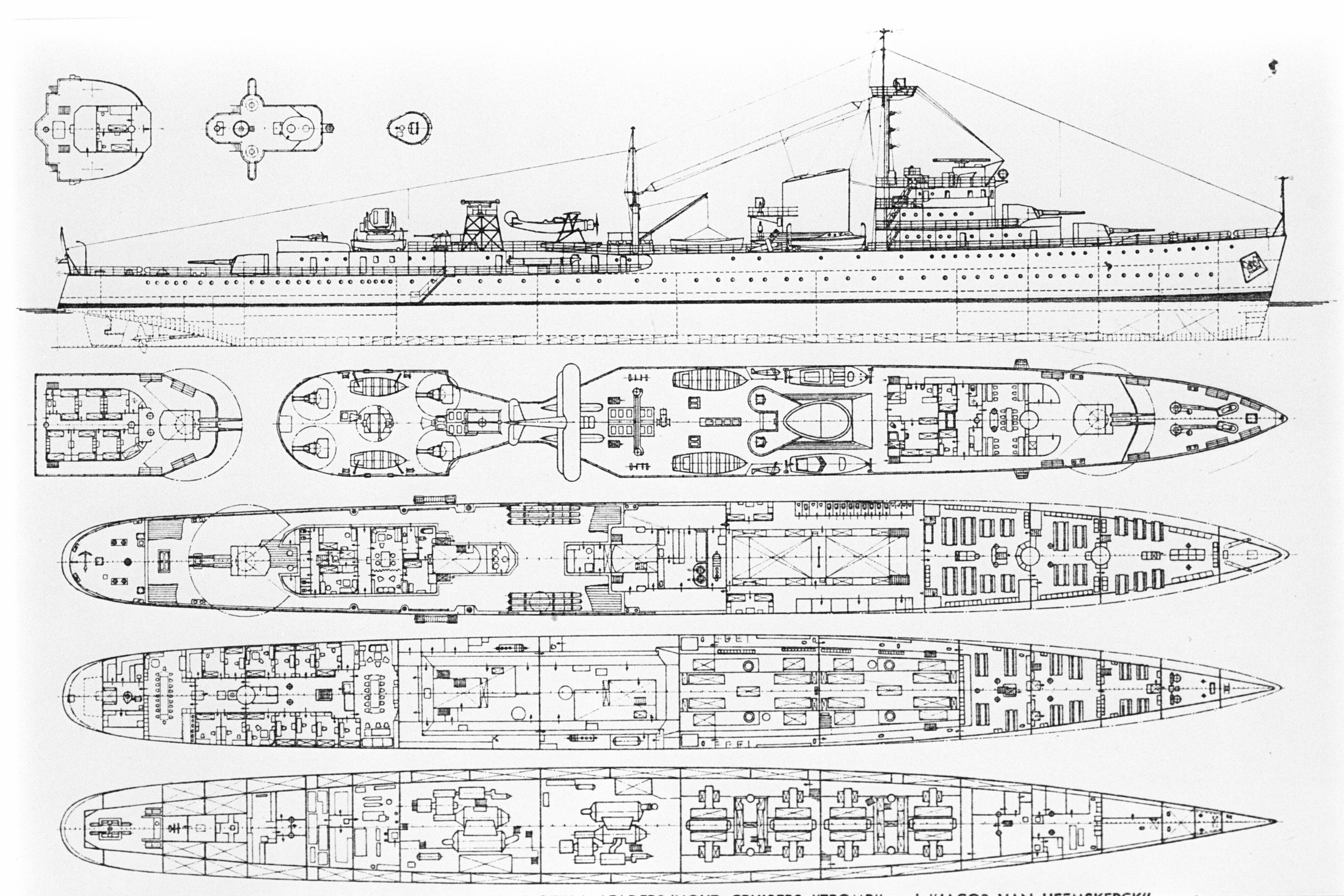
general arrangement plan of Tromp as intended. Note the four gun mounts behind the aircraft.

== Design ==
After the design was enlarged to the size of a cruiser for service in the East Indies, the ships displaced 3,787 long tons (3,848 t) and measured 131.9 m (433 ft) in length, with a beam of 12.4 m (41 ft) and a draft of 4.6 m (15 ft). Four oil-fired boilers turned two turbines and two propellers, which produced 56,000 shp (42,000 kW) and a design speed of 33.5 knots (62.0 km/h; 38.6 mph), although Tromp reached 34.5 knots (63.9 km/h; 39.7 mph) during her sea trials.

Their hulls were longitudinally subdivided into 17 torpedo bulkheads between 20–30 mm (0.79–1.18 in) thick that was reinforced by a double hull which extended for about 60% of the ships' length. The main deck was 15–25 mm (0.59–0.98 in) thick and was joined by a lower deck 25 mm (0.98 in) thick above the forward magazine and 16 mm (0.63 in) over the steering gear and aft magazine. The turrets and barbettes were also 16 mm (0.63 in) thick, and the conning tower was protected by 13 mm (0.51 in) of armor.

Tromp was the only ship built to the initial design. She was fitted with three twin 15 cm (5.9 in) turrets–two mounted on the bow and one stern–and an anti-air compliment that consisted of two (Note: Four were planned to be fitted, but only two were actually mounted) twin 4.0 cm (40 mm) Bofors at the back of her forecastle deck and two twin 1.3 cm (.5 in) machine guns. She was also equipped with two triple 53 cm (21 in) torpedo tubes located midship on either side, a Fokker C.VIX floatplane, and a crane that lowered the aircraft into the water. Jacob van Heemskerck was uncompleted when she fled the Netherlands during the German Invasion, and was instead fitted out by the Royal Navy who envisioned her as an anti-air cruiser. As such, she was fitted with five twin 100 mm (4 in) Mk XVI turrets: three in the same location as Tromp, and a turret on each side where the torpedo tubes and aircraft were planned. She was also given an additional mast to carry a British air-search radar, two depth charge racks, six 20 mm (0.79 in) guns, and a quad 2-pounder naval gun, although the exact armament of both ships changed over time.

== Ships ==
=== Tromp ===
After she entered service in 1938, Tromp initially operated in the Mediterranean and off the European coast. In 1939, she was sent to reinforce the East Indies, where the Dutch government believed a war against Japan was inevitable. Following the outbreak of World War II and Dutch capitulation, the cruiser operated under Royal Navy command and escorted vital convoys throughout the region. By February 1942, the Dutch East Indies was invaded from multiple sides by Japan as allied forces were overwhelmed. In an effort to coordinate resistance, elements of the British, Dutch, and American navies formed the Combined Striking Force. Tromp sailed with the fleet and withstood several air attacks before she was badly damaged by Japanese destroyers during the Battle of Badung Strait. She was repaired in Australia and attached to the US 7th Fleet for anti-submarine patrols in the western Pacific throughout 1943. In January of the next year, she joined the British Eastern Fleet for a series of aircraft carrier raids against the occupied Indonesian islands. During Operation Cockpit, Crimson, and Transom, she shelled enemy land instillations before she supported the invasions of Rangoon and Borneo in 1945. At the end of the war, she accepted the surrender of Belitung and returned to Europe. For the rest of her career, she joined allied forces in the North Atlantic before she was demoted to a training ship.

=== Jacob van Heemskerck ===
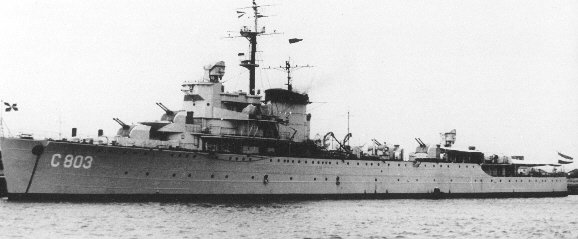
Jacob van Heemskerk during World War II, armed as a British air-defense cruiser.

When the Netherlands was invaded by Germany, Jacob van Heemskerck was still working up. Her commissioning was hastened, and she fled for Great Britain on the night of 14 May. While her main battery and 20 mm (0.79 in) guns had been installed prior to her departure, the rangefinders for her main battery were still missing. Once arrived in England, she would receive depth charge racks from the torpedo boats G13 and G15. She then escorted members of the Dutch royal family to Canada before she sailed to Portsmouth for completion. As there were no rangefinders available that paired with her armament, and no torpedo tubes had been installed, she would instead be converted into an air-defense cruiser starting in June. Work was finished in February 1941, and she patrolled parts of the North Atlantic before getting deployed to the Pacific with the British East Indies Fleet in 1942. She then participated in the Invasion of Madagascar and patrolled the Indian Ocean, escorting convoys and sinking the German blockade runner Ramses in the process. By 1944, the cruiser returned to Britain and continued to escort convoys in the Mediterranean and Atlantic for the rest of the war. Following German capitulation, she became the first ship to warship to visit Amsterdam after its liberation. After the war, she became the flagship of HNLMS Karel Doorman's task force and was reduced to an accommodations ship in 1955.

Construction data
Name	Builder	Laid down	Launched	Commissioned	Decommissioned
Tromp	NSM, Amsterdam	17 January 1936	24 May 1937	18 August 1938	10 December 1968
Jacob van Heemskerck	NSM, Amsterdam	31 October 1938	16 September 1939	10 May 1940	27 February 1970

== See also ==
- List of cruisers of the Netherlands
- La Galissonnière-class cruiser
- Capitani Romani-class cruiser
- Agano-class cruiser
