= HNLMS Michiel Gardeyn =

K-class torpedo boat

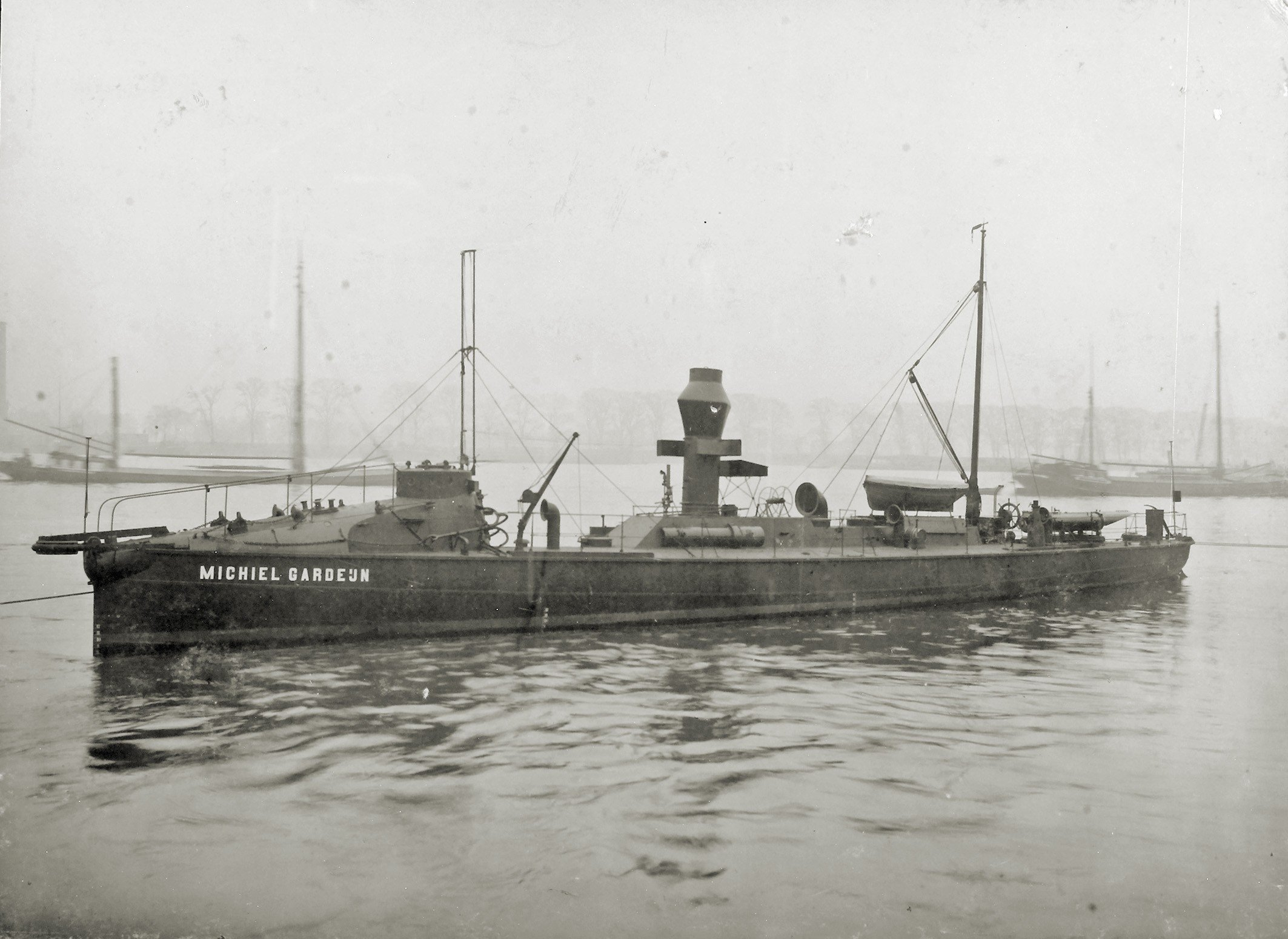
- Michiel Gardeyn in 1905

History

Netherlands
- Name: Michiel Gardeyn
- Owner: Koninklijke Marine
- Builder: Maatschappij voor Scheeps- en Werktuigbouw Fijenoord
- Laid down: 1904
- Launched: 1905
- Commissioned: 1905
- Decommissioned: 1921
- Fate: Sunk as target ship for an airstrike exercise in 1921

General characteristics
- Type: Torpedo boat
- Displacement: 47.9 tons
- Length: 30.0 m (98 ft 5 in)
- Beam: 3.6 m (11 ft 10 in)
- Draft: 1.72 m (5 ft 8 in)
- Propulsion: 1 triple expansion machine; 1 coal-fired cylindrical boiler; 592 hp (441 kW)
- Speed: 18.6 knots (34.4 km/h)
- Range: 500 nmi (930 km) at 9 kn (17 km/h)
- Complement: 12
- Armament: 1 × 37 mm (1.5 in) gun; 2 × 45 cm (18 in) torpedo tubes (2 × 1)

Michiel Gardeyn, initially called K 1, was a K-class torpedo boat of the Dutch Koninklijke Marine. She was decommissioned in 1921.

== Service history ==
Michiel Gardeyn was commissioned in to the Koninklijke Marine in 1905. She was sunk in 1921 as target ship during an airstrike exercise together with the torpedo boats Draak and Krokodil.
