= HNLMS Jacob van Heemskerck (1939) =

Royal Netherlands Navy light cruiser

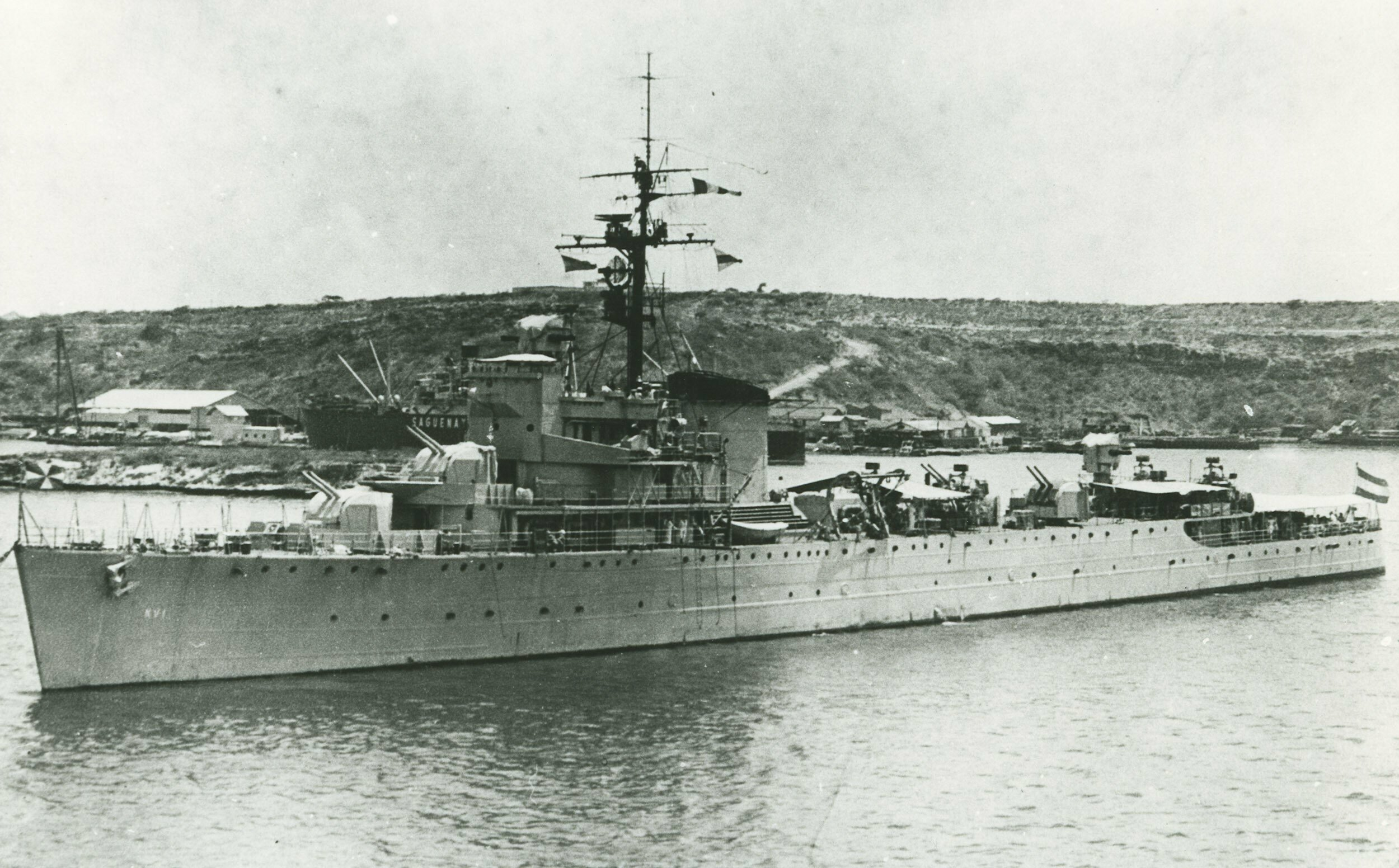
- Jacob van Heemskerck in 1950

History

Netherlands
- Name: Jacob van Heemskerck
- Namesake: Jacob van Heemskerck
- Builder: Nederlandsche Scheepsbouw Mij., Amsterdam; completed in British yard
- Laid down: 31 October 1938
- Launched: 16 September 1939
- Completed: 10 May 1940
- Commissioned: 16 September 1939
- Decommissioned: 20 November 1969
- Stricken: 27 February 1970
- Fate: Sold for scrap, 23 June 1970

General characteristics
- Class & type: Tromp-class light cruiser
- Displacement: 4,150 t (4,084 long tons) standard 4,860 t (4,783 long tons) full load
- Length: 132 m (433 ft 1 in)
- Beam: 12.4 m (40 ft 8 in)
- Draught: 4.3 m (14 ft 1 in)
- Propulsion: 2 Parsons geared steam turbines; 4 Yarrow boilers; 2 shafts; 56,000 shp (41,759 kW)
- Speed: 33 knots (38 mph; 61 km/h)
- Complement: 393 or 420
- Armament: 10 × 102 mm (4 in) guns (5×2); 8 × 40 mm (4×2); 8 × 20 mm AA cannon; 2 × depth charge rails
- Armour: Belt: 2–2.5 in (51–64 mm); Deck: 1.5 in (38 mm)

HNLMS Jacob van Heemskerck (Note: "HNLMS" stands for "Her Netherlands Majesty's Ship" but the Royal Netherlands Navy uses "Hr. Ms." (Dutch: Harer Majesteits, English: Her Majesty's ) instead of the international HNLMS; That is only the HM.) was the second and last of the Tromp-class destroyer leaders of the Royal Netherlands Navy, named after Admiral Jacob van Heemskerck.

Originally designated as a flotilla leader and a torpedo cruiser in Decker's Fleet Plan of 1931, she was hastily commissioned on 10 May 1940, when Germany invaded the Netherlands. However, as she was not armed she escaped to the United Kingdom, where she was refitted as an air defence cruiser, since these were the only type of gun available, and there was a growing need for this type of ship to protect the convoys. During the Second World War the crew felt that their ship was blessed and gave her the nickname Oude Jacob (Old Jacob). She received the reputation for proficiency, and not a single convoy ship would be lost when she was on duty.

== Service history ==
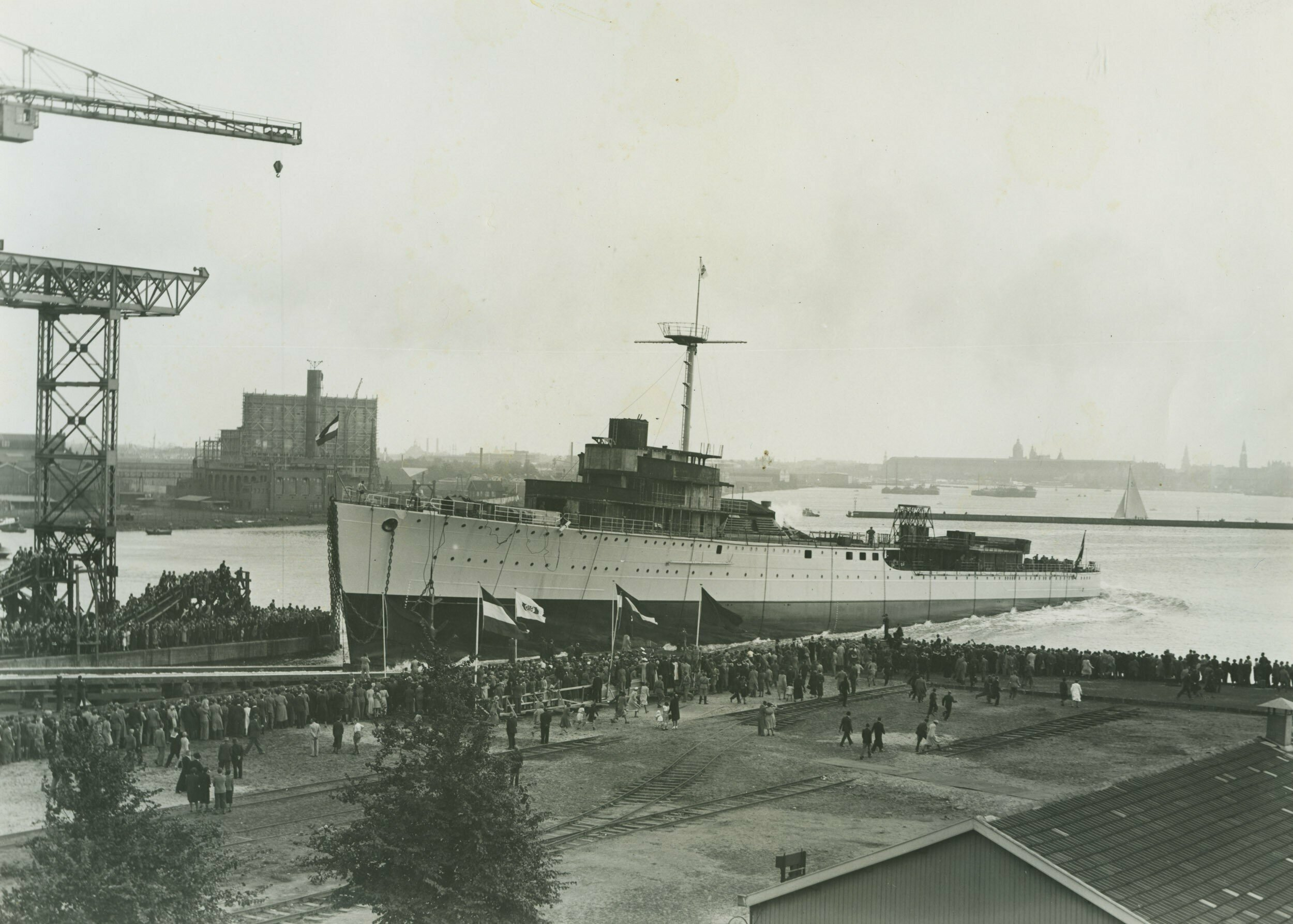
Launch of the light cruiser in May 1940.

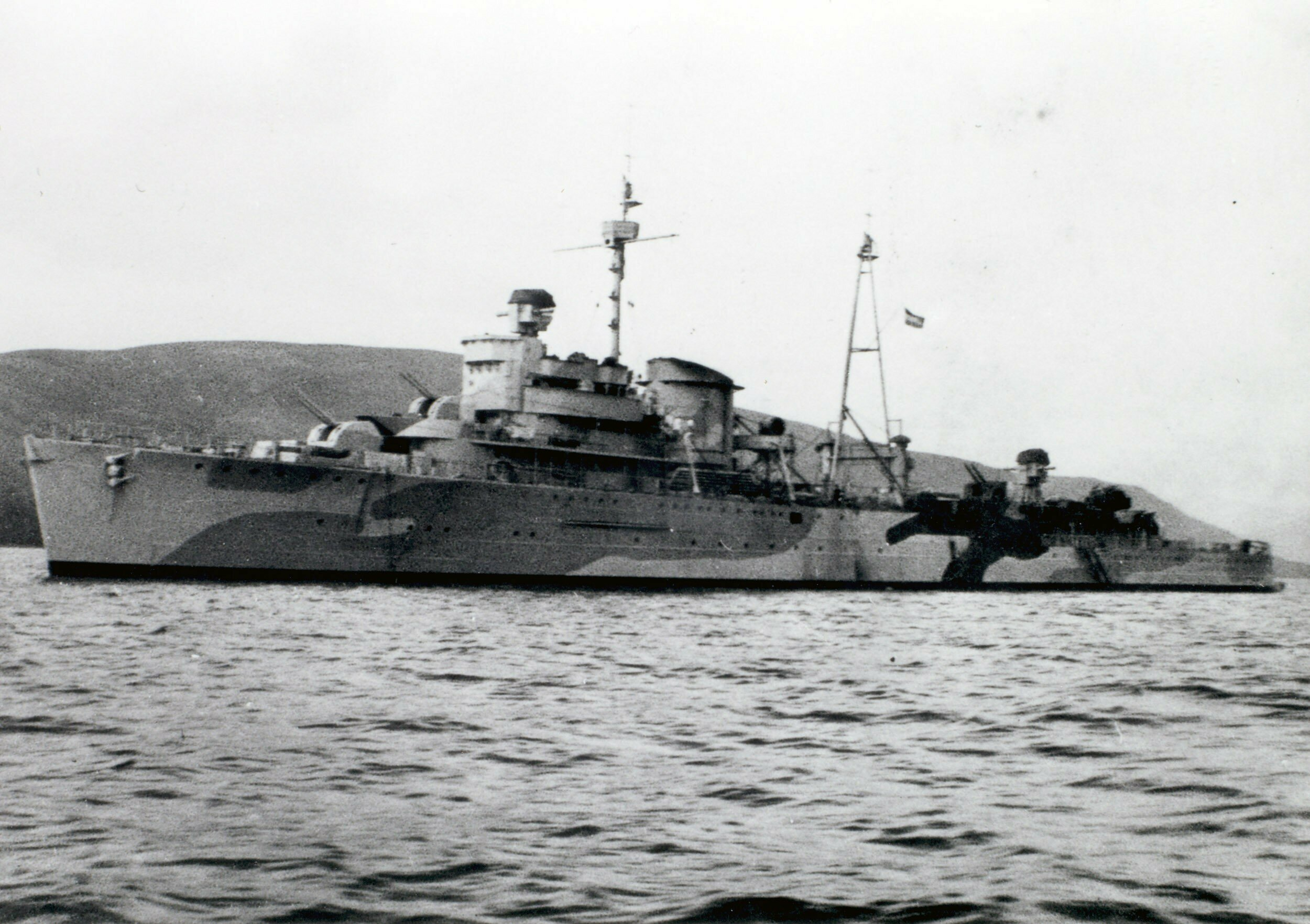
Jacob van Heemskerck in 1941

The ship was meant to commence trials on the day the Germans invaded, and to prevent her capture the Jacob van Heemskerck was immediately pressed into service. Since she had no armament she left port for the United Kingdom with only a skeleton crew. Once she had arrived in Portsmouth attempts were made to give her weaponry of some sort. She received depth charge equipment from the old torpedo boats G13 and G15. On 18 May 1940, Queen Wilhelmina paid the ship a visit. At the end of the month, Jacob van Heemskerck and the cruiser HNLMS Sumatra received the assignment to transport Princess Juliana and her two children (including the later Beatrix of the Netherlands) to Canada. The ships put to sea on 2 June and arrived on 11 June at Halifax.

Jacob van Heemskerck returned alone to England and arrived at Portsmouth in July where her re-arming programme began. The British Admiralty decided to convert her to an anti-aircraft ship. Work was completed on 17 February 1941, and after sea trials, which lasted till 29 February, the ship was assigned as a convoy escort in the Atlantic Ocean as part of the Irish Sea Escort.

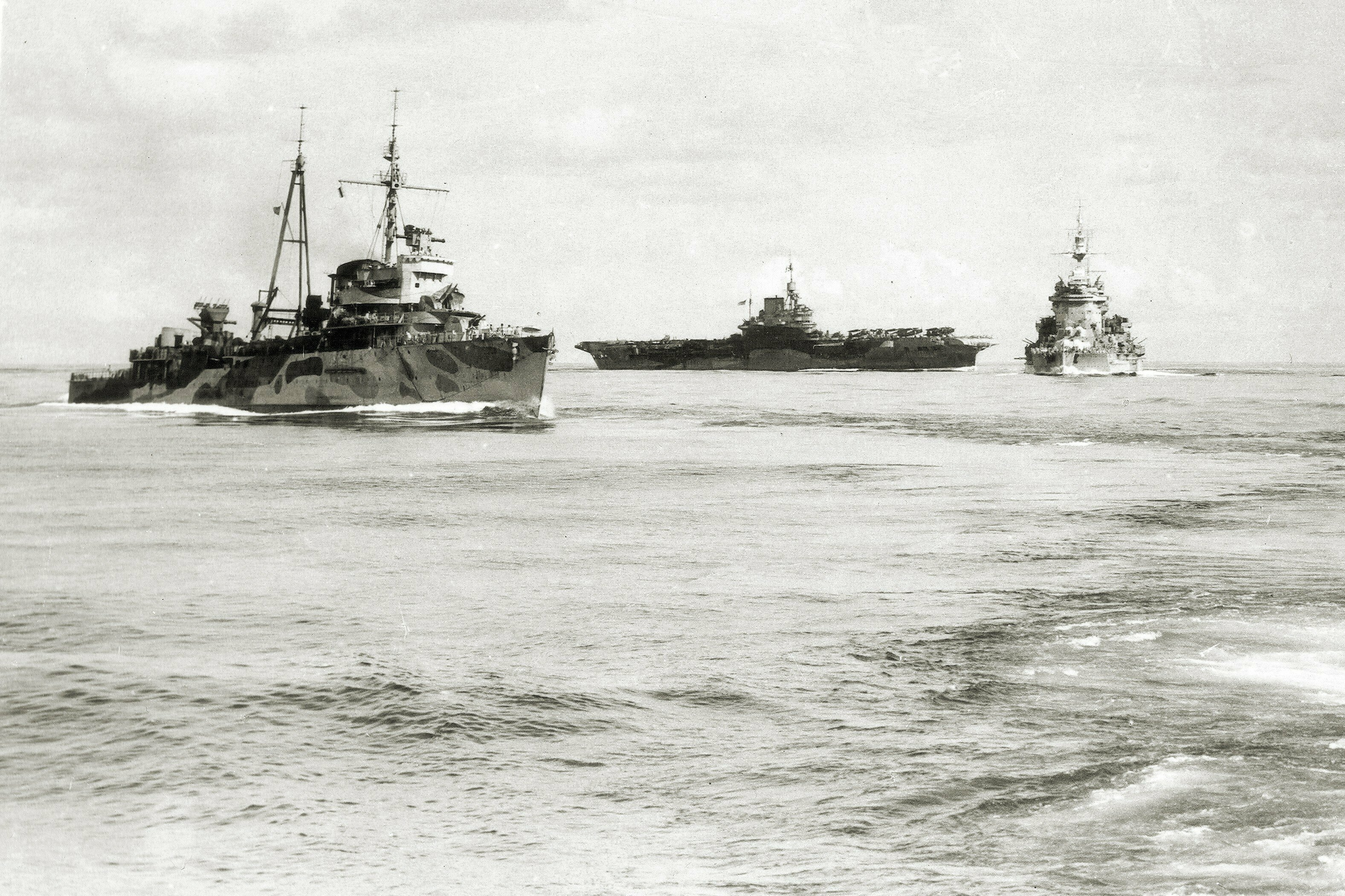
Jacob van Heemskerck alongside HMS Illustrious and HMS Warspite. Exact date unknown.

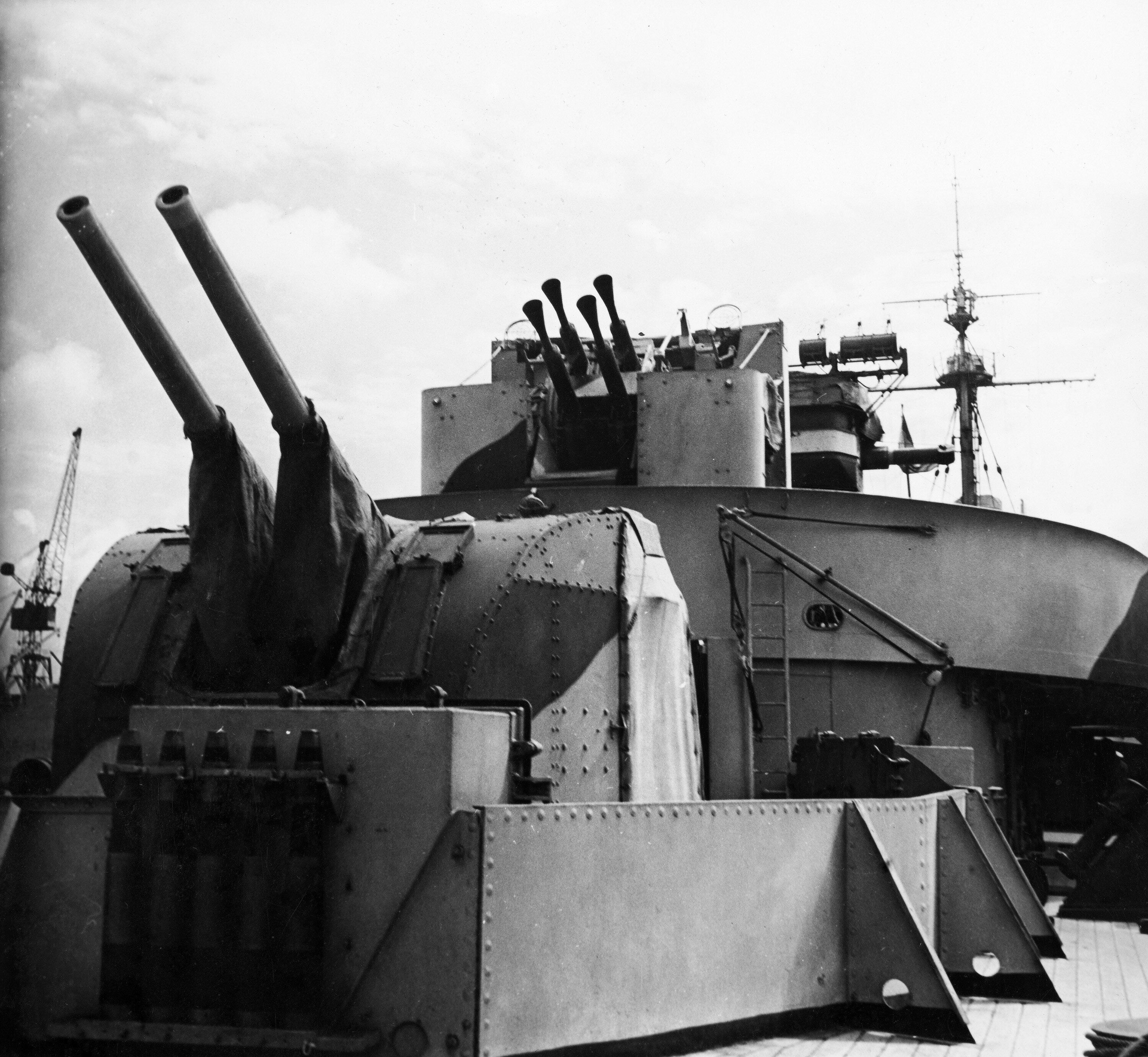
The 4-inch and 40 mm anti-aircraft armament onboard.

She was removed from escort duty in January 1942 and sent to the Dutch East Indies to reinforce the defence fleet assembled there. The ship arrived too late to take part in the battle of the Java Sea and was reassigned to the Eastern Fleet in 1942. In September 1942 the ship took part in operations 'Stream' and 'Jane', both aimed at the retaking of Madagascar. On 25 October Jacob van Heemskerck arrived at Fremantle, Australia, and came under the command of Allied Naval Forces Western Australia, where she performed convoy duties.

On 28 November 1942, Jacob van Heemskerck, in the company of the Australian cruiser HMAS Adelaide, identified and intercepted the German supply vessel and blockade runner Ramses in the Indian Ocean while posing as a Norwegian ship; the German freighter was subsequently scuttled by her own crew and finished off by the Allied warships.

On 1 December 1943, the ship returned to the Eastern Fleet and on 27 December, she set sail for the Mediterranean Sea where she, again, performed convoy duties till she was recalled to England for maintenance in June 1944.

On 26 July 1945 Jacob van Heemskerck arrived at Amsterdam, the first Dutch warship to do so after Liberation Day. In September of that year she set sail for the Dutch East Indies, where she performed patrol duties until 22 July 1946. She returned to the Netherlands in August of that year.

=== Post-war ===
In September 1947 Jacob van Heemskerck performed, together with HNLMS Karel Doorman, a demonstration for Dutch journalists. During this demonstration Karel Doorman launched aircraft from its deck, while Jacob van Heemskerck fired blank rounds.

From 12 March 1951 she served as a barracks ship for naval trainees in Vlissingen. She served in this capacity in several other locations. The cruiser was decommissioned on 20 November 1969, and was struck from the Naval Registry on 27 February 1970. On 23 June 1970 the ship was sold for scrap.
