= HNLMS Willem Warmont =

K-class torpedo boat

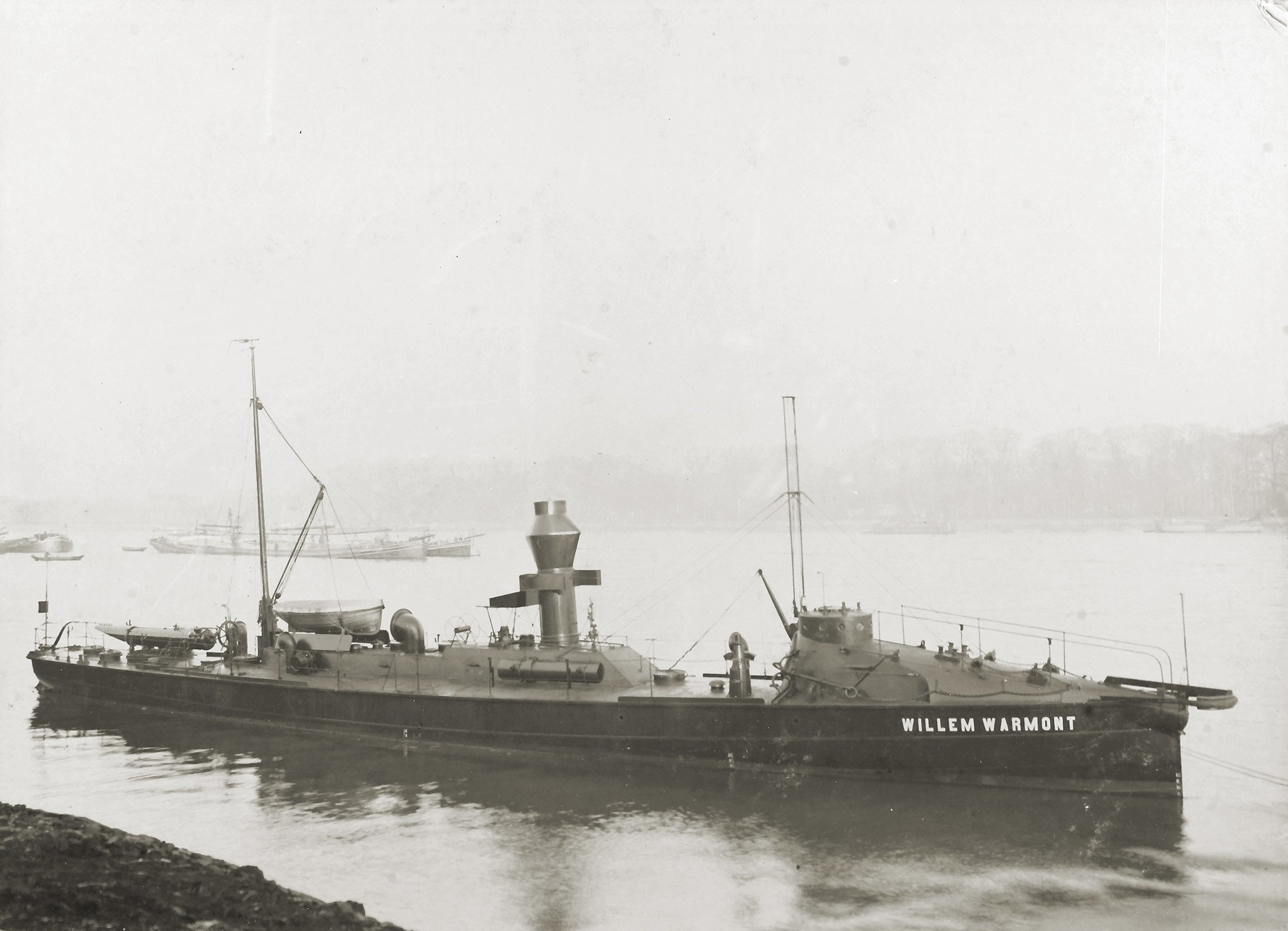
- Torpedo boat Willem Warmont

History

Netherlands
- Name: Willem Warmont
- Owner: Koninklijke Marine
- Builder: Maatschappij voor Scheeps- en Werktuigbouw Fijenoord
- Laid down: 1904
- Launched: 1905
- Commissioned: 1905
- Decommissioned: 1937
- Fate: Decommissioned in 1937

General characteristics
- Type: Torpedo boat
- Displacement: 47.9 tons
- Length: 30.0 m (98 ft 5 in)
- Beam: 3.6 m (11 ft 10 in)
- Draft: 1.72 m (5 ft 8 in)
- Propulsion: 1 triple expansion machine; 1 coal-fired cylindrical boiler; 592 hp (441 kW)
- Speed: 18.6 knots (34.4 km/h)
- Range: 500 nmi (930 km) at 9 kn (17 km/h)
- Complement: 12
- Armament: 1 × 37 mm (1.5 in) gun; 2 × 45 cm (18 in) torpedo tubes (2 × 1)

Willem Warmont, initially called K 3, was a K-class torpedo boat of the Dutch Koninklijke Marine. She was decommissioned in 1937.

== Service history ==
Willem Warmont was commissioned in to the Koninklijke Marine in 1905. In 1936 she was being used as a training vessel for engineers and stokers. She was decommissioned from service in 1937.
