= HNLMS Christiaan Cornelis =

K-class torpedo boat

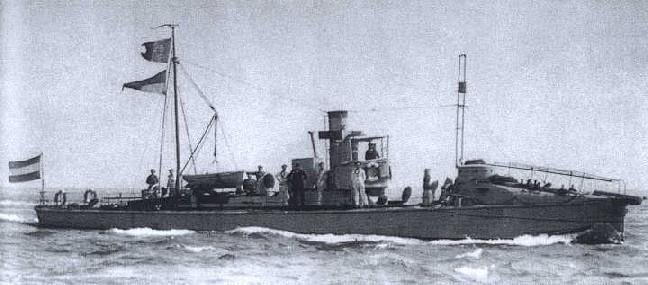
- Christiaan Cornelis in the early 1930s

History

Netherlands
- Name: Christiaan Cornelis
- Owner: Koninklijke Marine
- Builder: Maatschappij voor Scheeps- en Werktuigbouw Fijenoord
- Laid down: 1904
- Launched: 1 September 1905
- Commissioned: 28 December 1905
- Decommissioned: 13 May 1940
- Fate: Scuttled 13 May 1940

General characteristics
- Type: Torpedo boat
- Displacement: 47.9 tons
- Length: 30.0 m (98 ft 5 in)
- Beam: 3.6 m (11 ft 10 in)
- Draft: 1.72 m (5 ft 8 in)
- Propulsion: 1 triple expansion machine; 1 coal-fired cylindrical boiler; 592 hp (441 kW)
- Speed: 18.6 knots (34.4 km/h)
- Range: 500 nmi (930 km) at 9 kn (17 km/h)
- Complement: 12
- Armament: 1 × 37 mm (1.5 in) gun; 2 × 45 cm (18 in) torpedo tubes (2 × 1)

Christiaan Cornelis, initially called K 2, was a K-class torpedo boat of the Dutch Koninklijke Marine. She saw action during World War II, however she was outdated by then and had lost most of her usefulness.

== Service history ==
Christiaan Cornelis was commissioned in to the Koninklijke Marine on 28 December 1905.

=== World War II ===
When Germany invaded the Netherlands on 10 May 1940, Christiaan Cornelis was assigned to the Onderzoekings- en Bewakingsdienst Bovenrivieren (OBB). Together with Tyr and Cressy she was stationed in the Waal near Nijmegen. During 10 May Christiaan Cornelis and Cressy opened fire at the accommodation ship Wilhelmina with their 3.7 cm guns after her cash register and classified documents were taken. Afterwards they joined Tyr and together the three ships patrolled on the Waal firing at German planes without shooting any down. After the Maas–Waal line fell the three ships were ordered to sail downstream.

On the early morning of 11 May the flotilla arrived in Tiel, here they were ordered to sail to Gorinchem and then via the Merwedekanaal to Meerkerk. The flotilla passed Gorinchem in the early evening before entering the Merwedekanaal. The trip along the narrow Merwedekanaal wasn't easy as the ships kept getting stuck. Upon arriving in Meerkerk the ships were ordered back through the Merwedekanaal to Gorinchem.

On 12 May, Christiaan Cornelis was ordered to Werkendam to protect a minefield, while the other two ships were sent to Loevestein Castle. Before reaching Werkendam Christiaan Cornelis was called back to Gorinchem. The motorboat De Twee Gezusters had tried to resupply Dutch forces in 's-Gravendeel with 12 tons of ammunition, however she had taken German fire from the Moerdijk bridge and was forced to retreat. Because the Dutch forces were in desperate need of more ammunition De Twee Gezusters was ordered to make another attempt, this time escorted by Christiaan Cornelis. Christiaan Cornelis got reinforced with five soldiers, before meeting with De Twee Gezusters on the Hollands Diep river.

The ships passed the Moerdijk bridge with De Twee Gezusters leading the two ships. Under 500 meters after passing the bridge the ships took German machinegun fire. As the Germans concentrated fire on the Christiaan Cornelis she turned around. Because the Germans had concentrated their fire on the torpedoboat the De Twee Gezusters managed to deliver the ammunition to Strijensas where it was transported to their destination by trucks.

The crew on Christiaan Cornelis had only suffered light injuries, however the torpedoboat itself had taken heavy damage and lost enginepower on the Holland Diep, coming to a complete stop. A tugboat towed the Christiaan Cornelis to Numansdorp. The next day the damage was declared too big to quickly repair and because the ship might draw attention from German planes it was decided to scuttle the ship. After demounting the armament and removing all valuable items the ship was scuttled on the Hollands Diep river between Numansdorp and Willemstad.
