= HNLMS Van Speijk (K3) =

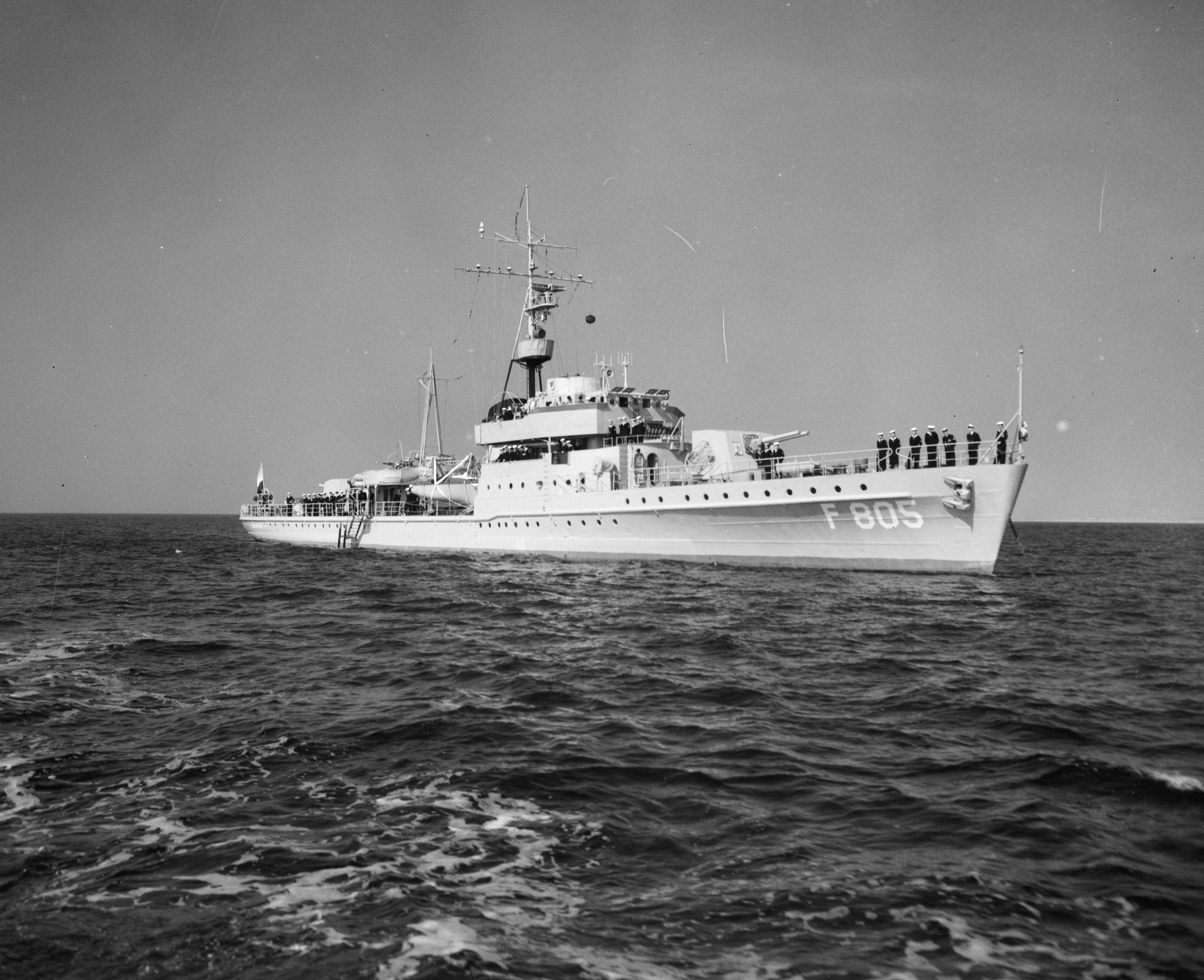
- Hr.Ms. Van Speijk (K3/F805)

History

Netherlands
- Name: Van Speijk
- Builder: P. Smit Jr., Rotterdam
- Laid down: 1939
- Launched: 22 March 1941
- Fate: Sold for scrap, 29 August 1960

General characteristics
- Class & type: K-class sloop
- Displacement: 1,200 long tons (1,219 t) standard; 1,420 long tons (1,443 t) full load
- Length: 77.9 m (255 ft 7 in)
- Beam: 10.2 m (33 ft 6 in)
- Draft: 3.2 m (10 ft 6 in)
- Installed power: 3,500 bhp (2,600 kW)
- Propulsion: 2 × screws
- Speed: 18 knots (33 km/h; 21 mph)
- Complement: 106
- Armament: 4 × 12 cm (4.7 in) (2 × 2); 4 × 3.7 cm (1.5 in) (2 × 2); 12 × 2 cm (0.79 in) (2×4 and 2×2)
- Armour: Deck: 2–3.5 cm (0.79–1.38 in); Belt: 3.7–6 cm (1.5–2.4 in); Turrets: 6 centimetres (2.4 in)

HNLMS Van Speijk (K3, later F805) was a K-class sloop, designed in the late 1930s to replace the aging Brinio-class gunboats of the Royal Netherlands Navy. Incomplete at the start of the German invasion of the Netherlands and not yet launched, K3 was found undamaged by the German forces. The Kriegsmarine ordered her completion, then commissioned her for service in Norwegian and German home waters.

After the war she was repaired at the Rijkswerf at Amsterdam, then entered Dutch service as the frigate Van Speijk (F805). She mainly served in the Dutch West Indies until she was scrapped in 1960.

== Description ==
The K-class ships were 77.9 metres (255 ft 7 in) long, with a beam of 10.2 metres (33 ft 6 in) and a draught of 3.2 metres (10 ft 6 in) at deep load. They displaced was 1,260 long tons (1,280 t) at normal load, which increased to 1,420 long tons (1,440 t) at deep load. A pair of diesel engines each drove a single propeller shaft. The engines were rated at 3,500 brake horsepower (2,600 kW) which gave the ships a speed of 14 knots (26 km/h; 16 mph). They carried up to 157 long tons (160 t) of fuel oil and had a complement of 106 officers and ratings.

== Bibliography ==
- Roberts, John (1980). "The Netherlands". In Chesneau, Roger (ed.). Conway's All the World's Fighting Ships 1922–1946. Greenwich, UK: Conway Maritime Press. pp. 385–396. ISBN 0-85177-146-7.
- van Willigenburg, Henk (2010). Dutch Warships of World War II. Emmen: Lanasta. ISBN 978-90-8616-318-2.
