= K-class sloop =

1939 sloop class of the Royal Netherlands Navy

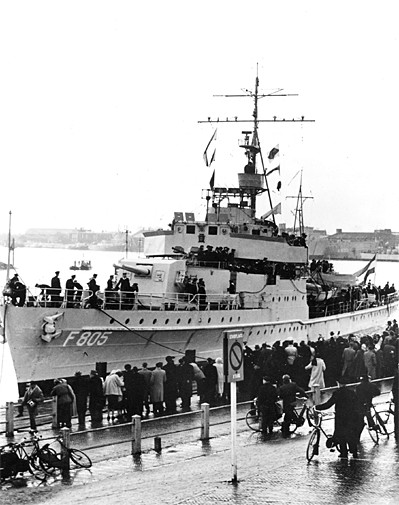
- HNLMS Van Speijk (K3) after World War II

Class overview
- Name: K class
- Builders: P. Smit Jr, Rotterdam (2); Gusto Shipyard, Schiedam (1)
- Operators: Royal Netherlands Navy; Kriegsmarine
- Built: 1939–1941
- Planned: 7
- Completed: 3
- Lost: 2
- Retired: 1

General characteristics
- Type: Sloop
- Displacement: As designed: 1,267 tons; 1470 tons (full load); As completed: 1,200 tons; 1420 tons (full load)
- Length: 77.9 m (255 ft 7 in)
- Beam: 10.3 m (33 ft 10 in)
- Draught: 3.4 m (11 ft 2 in)
- Propulsion: As designed: 3,500 ihp (2,600 kW), two shafts; As completed: 2,770 ihp (2,070 kW), two shafts (K1); 3,500 ihp (2,600 kW), two shafts (K2 and K3)
- Speed: As designed: 19 knots (35 km/h); As completed: 14.5 knots (26.9 km/h) (K1 and K2); 18 knots (33 km/h) (K3)
- Complement: As designed: 99; As completed: 161-184
- Armament: As designed: 4 × 12 cm (4.7 in) (2 × 2); 4 × 4 cm (1.6 in) (2 × 2); 4 × .50 MG; As completed: 4 × 12 cm (4.7 in) (2 × 2); 4 × 3.7 cm (1.5 in) (2 × 2); 12 × 2 cm (0.79 in) (2x4 and 2x2)
- Armour: 2 cm (0.79 in) to 3.5 cm (1.4 in) deck; 3.7 centimetres (1.5 in) to 6 centimetres (2.4 in) Belt; 6 centimetres (2.4 in)Turrets

The K class was a class of three sloops designed in the late 1930s to replace the aging Brinio-class gunboats of the Royal Netherlands Navy. Originally seven ships were planned of which three ships were laid down and two more ordered (which were canceled after the German invasion). Still incomplete at the start of the German invasion of the Netherlands and not yet launched, the ships were found undamaged by the German forces. The Kriegsmarine ordered the completion of K1, K2 and K3, then commissioned them for service in Norwegian and German home waters. After the war only K3 entered Dutch service as the Van Speijk.

== Construction ==
K1 and K3 were laid down at the P. Smit Jr, Rotterdam shipyard in 1939. K2 was laid down at Gusto N.V., Schiedam shipyard also in 1939. Still incomplete at the start of the German invasion of the Netherlands and not yet launched, the ships were found undamaged by the German forces and the Kriegsmarine ordered the completion of K1, K2 and K3. K1 was launched on 23 November 1940. Both K2 and K3 were launched in 1941 on 28 June and 22 March. The ships were commissioned in 1941 and 1942.

== Service history ==
The ships saw service in Norwegian and German home waters. K1 sank near Aarhus on 5 May 1945. K2 was found in Horten in 1945 and towed back to the Delfzijl where she sank by accident in November of that year. The ship was raised the next year on 26 July and towed to Den Helder where she was sold for scrap in October 1947 after inspection. After the war only K3 entered Dutch service as the Van Speijk after she was repaired at the Rijkswerf at Amsterdam. The ship was sold for scrap 29 August 1960.

== Ships ==
| Name | Builder | Laid down | Launched | Completed | Fate |
|---|---|---|---|---|---|
| K1 | P. Smit Jr., Rotterdam | 2 August 1939 | 23 November 1940 | 2 October 1941 | Captured by the Germans in May 1940. Sunk on 5 May 1945 by the Royal Air Force |
| K2 | Gusto Shipyard, Schiedam | 1939 | 28 June 1941 | 14 November 1942 | Captured by the Germans in May 1940. Heavily damaged by an aerial torpedo 9 October 1944, towed back to port. Sold for scrap October 1947. |
| K3 | P. Smit Jr., Rotterdam | 23 June 1939 | 22 March 1941 | 2 February 1942 | Captured by the Germans in May 1940. Found after the war and returned to the Royal Netherlands Navy on 18 July 1946. Sold for scrap 29 August 1960 |
| K4 | P. Smit Jr., Rotterdam | - | - | - | Cancelled by the Royal Netherlands Navy when Germany invaded the Netherlands in May 1940. |
| K5 | P. Smit Jr., Rotterdam | - | - | - | Cancelled by the Royal Netherlands Navy when Germany invaded the Netherlands in May 1940. |
