= K-class torpedo boat =

Ship class

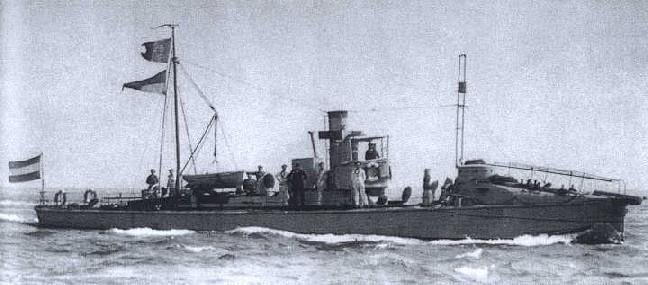
- HNLMS Christiaan Cornelis, the second ship in the K class

Class overview
- Builders: Maatschappij voor Scheeps- en Werktuigbouw Fijenoord
- Operators: Royal Netherlands Navy
- Built: 1904–1905
- In commission: 1905–1940
- Planned: 3
- Completed: 3
- Lost: 1
- Retired: 2

General characteristics
- Type: Torpedo boat
- Displacement: 47,9 tons
- Length: 30.0 m (98 ft 5 in)
- Beam: 3.6 m (11 ft 10 in)
- Draft: 1.72 m (5 ft 8 in)
- Propulsion: 1 triple expansion machine; 1 coal-fired cylindrical boiler; 592 hp
- Speed: 18.6 kn (34.4 km/h)
- Range: 500 nmi (930 km) at 9 kn (17 km/h)
- Complement: 12
- Armament: 1 × 37 mm (1.5 in) gun; 2 × 45 cm (18 in) torpedo tubes (2 × 1)

The K-class torpedo boats were a class of three small warships that served in the Dutch Koninklijke Marine. The K stands for 'Klein' (Dutch for 'small'), as these ships were ordered next to the larger G 1-class torpedo boat, where the G stands for 'Groot' (Dutch for 'big'). The 48-ton ships were ordered in 1904 and commissioned the next year. Christiaan Cornelis saw limited action at the start of World War II during the Battle of the Netherlands in 1940.

== Ships ==
Name	Builder	Laid down	Launched	Commissioned	Fate
Michiel Gardeyn	Maatschappij voor Scheeps- en Werktuigbouw Fijenoord	1904	1905	1905	Decommissioned in 1921, sunk as target ship for an airstrike practice in 1921
Christiaan Cornelis	Maatschappij voor Scheeps- en Werktuigbouw Fijenoord	1904	1 September 1905	28 December 1905	Scuttled 13 May 1940, after being damaged by German machine gun fire the previous day
Willem Warmont	Maatschappij voor Scheeps- en Werktuigbouw Fijenoord	1904	1905	1905	Decommissioned in 1937
