= George Formby on screen, stage, record and radio =

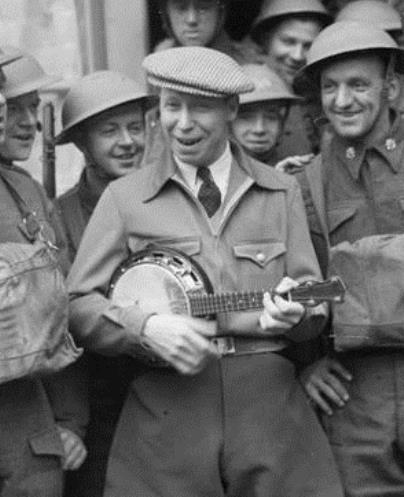
Formby entertaining British troops during the Second World War

The English comic, singer and actor George Formby (1904–1961) performed in many mediums of light entertainment, including film, radio and theatre. His career spanned from 1915 until December 1960. During that time he became synonymous with playing "a shy, innocent, gauche, accident-prone Lancashire lad".

Formby began his working life as a jockey but always held an ambition to become a performer. In 1915, against the wishes of his father, Formby made his screen debut in the film By the Shortest of Heads. Upon his father's death in 1921, he began to build a full-time performing career, and worked predominantly on the variety circuit. In 1926 he began his music career, singing light, comical songs, and playing the ukulele or banjolele. From 1934 he increasingly worked in film, and had become a major star by the 1930s and '40s. He appeared on television for the first time in 1938 in the festive special Christmas Greetings. He became the UK's highest-paid entertainer during those decades. The film historian Brian McFarlane writes that Formby portrayed "essentially gormless incompetents, aspiring to various kinds of professional success ... and even more improbably to a middle-class girlfriend, usually in the clutches of some caddish type with a moustache. Invariably he scored on both counts".

During the Second World War Formby joined the Entertainments National Service Association (ENSA), and entertained civilians and troops; by 1946 it was estimated that he had performed in front of three million service personnel. Formby appeared in his final film role in 1946, the commercially unsuccessful George in Civvy Street. He toured Canada, Australia, South Africa and Sweden and appeared on local and national radio during his travels. He continued to record songs and appear on television into the 1950s; on 16 December 1960 he appeared in The Friday Show: George Formby in a farewell programme looking back at his life. His biographer, David Bret, observes that the show is "generally regarded as George's greatest performance—it was certainly his most sincere".

Formby died of a heart attack in 1961. His biographer, the academic Jeffrey Richards, considers that Formby "had been able to embody simultaneously Lancashire, the working classes, the people, and the nation", also observing that "his passing was genuinely and widely mourned".

== Filmography ==
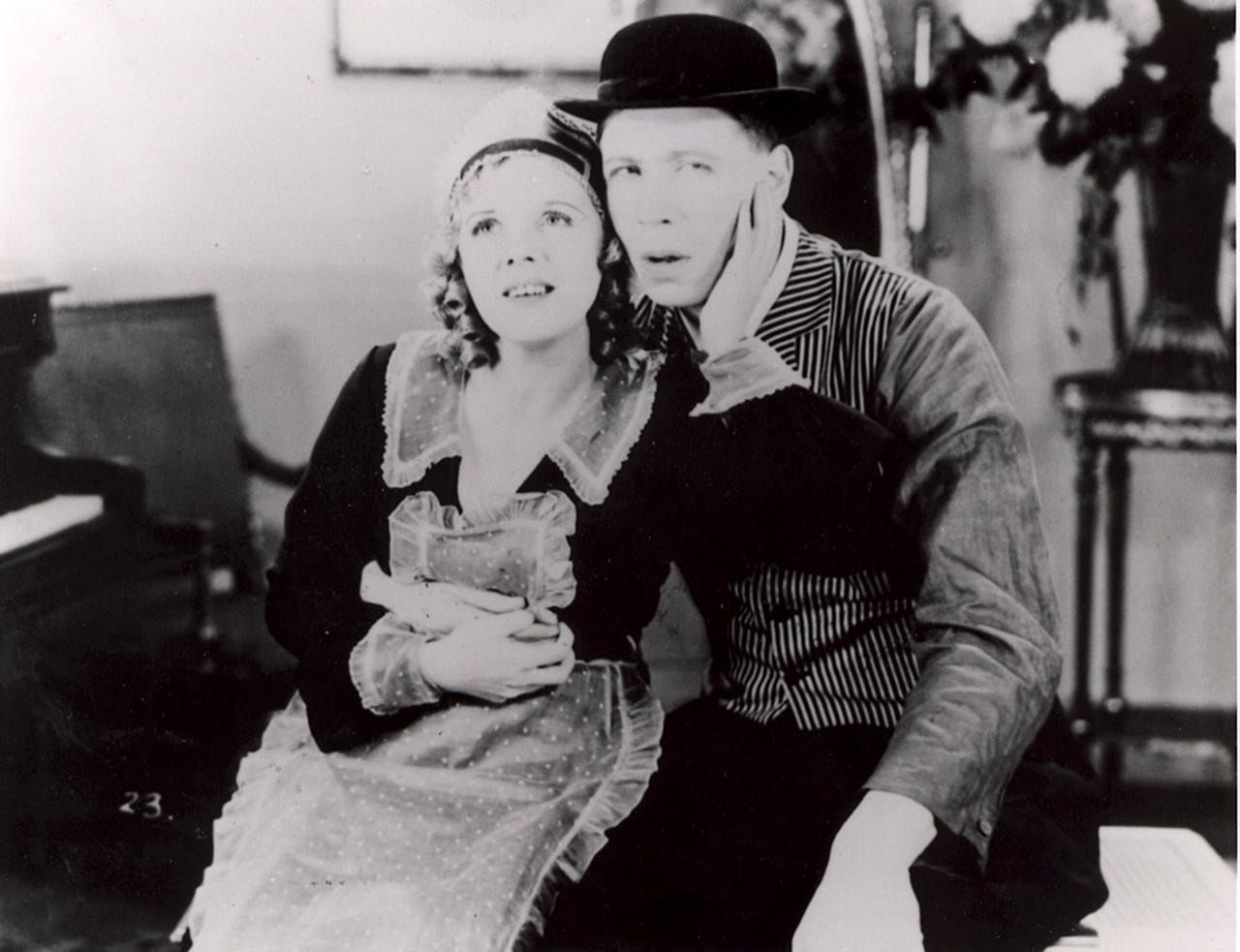
George and Beryl Formby in Boots! Boots!, 1934

Film sequence
Title	Release	Director	Studio	Plot	Ref.
By the Shortest of Heads	1915	Bert Haldane	Barker Motion Photography	A ten-year-old stable hand outwits a gang of villains, and wins a £10,000 prize when he comes first in a horse race. (Note: Considered a lost film, with the last-known copy destroyed in 1940.)	
Boots! Boots!	1934	Bert Tracy	Blakeley's Productions	A boot boy at a prestigious hotel falls in love with a maid who is a niece of a wealthy hotel guest.	
Off the Dole	1935	Arthur Mertz	Mancunian Film Corporation	A work-shy young man is struck off the dole and is employed by his uncle's detective agency, tracking down criminals.	
No Limit	1935	Monty Banks	Associated Talking Pictures	An amateur racing driver unexpectedly wins the Isle of Man's Tourist Trophy and the heart of a charm-school actress.	
Keep Your Seats, Please	1936	Monty Banks	Associated Talking Pictures	A desperate boyfriend pawns his banjo in order to help stop his girlfriend's niece from moving into an orphanage. He then discovers that a late aunt left him a large inheritance which proves to be elusive. (Note: Formby performed "When I'm Cleaning Windows" on screen for the first time.)	
Feather Your Nest	1937	William Beaudine	Associated Talking Pictures	An incompetent apprentice sound engineer passes off an established performer's song as his own and becomes an overnight star.	
Keep Fit	1937	Anthony Kimmins	Associated Talking Pictures	A feeble hairdresser takes up boxing and triumphs in the ring over an athletic opponent.	
I See Ice	1938	Anthony Kimmins	Associated Talking Pictures	A prop man with a touring ice ballet invents a new mini camera concealed in a bow-tie. He inadvertently takes a compromising photo of a crook at work.	
It's in the Air	1938	Anthony Kimmins	Associated Talking Pictures	A bungling recruit begins his R.A.F. training and gets mistaken for a regularly enlisted airman, much to the annoyance of his strict sergeant major.	
Trouble Brewing	1939	Anthony Kimmins	Associated Talking Pictures	A young newspaper reporter attempts to expose a gang of counterfeiters.	
Come On George!	1939	Anthony Kimmins	Associated Talking Pictures	A stable-hand forms a bond with a nervous horse and encourages the animal to become a success on the racecourse.	
Let George Do It!	1940	Marcel Varnel	Associated Talking Pictures	A ukulele player is mistaken for a British spy and unwittingly foils a plot by German intelligence agents.	
Spare a Copper	1940	John Paddy Carstairs	Associated Talking Pictures	A policeman during the Second World War foils a plot to destroy a warship.	
Turned Out Nice Again	1941	Marcel Varnel	Associated Talking Pictures	An employee at an underwear factory struggles to keep both his modern wife and his battle-axe mother in domestic bliss.	
South American George	1941	Marcel Varnel	Columbia Pictures	An eager-to-please show business agent hires a more capable singer in the place of an untalented opera performer.	
Much Too Shy	1942	Marcel Varnel	Columbia Pictures	A group of art students help a reserved odd-job man pursue his interest in painting nude portraits.	
Get Cracking	1943	Marcel Varnel	Columbia Pictures	A vehicle mechanic converts a truck into a tank and defeats a neighbouring town's villagers in a friendly Home Guard exercise.	
Bell-Bottom George	1944	Marcel Varnel	Columbia Pictures	A rejected serviceman loses the affections of his girlfriend. To win her back he pretends to be a sailor and in doing so, foils a sinister plan by a group of spies. His success leads to a rekindling of his relationship and fame among the local community.	
He Snoops to Conquer	1945	Marcel Varnel	Columbia Pictures	Two London reporters investigate an alleged corruption case in a sleepy town. They are unwittingly assisted by a local handyman who has been ordered to destroy the evidence by his bosses at the council.	
I Didn't Do It	1945	Marcel Varnel	Columbia Pictures	An amateur performer in London stays with other entertainers in a hotel, and becomes a murder suspect when an Australian acrobat is killed in the next room.	
George in Civvy Street	1946	Marcel Varnel	Columbia Pictures	A publican falls in love with a waitress from a rival establishment who is also being romantically pursued by her boss.	

== Stage credits ==
An advertisement from The Burnley News, May 1921 for George Hoy

Formby appeared on stage in numerous variety and music hall performances, although no full record exists. He appeared in variety shows and concerts for troops with the Entertainments National Service Association (ENSA) during the Second World War, as well as in regular winter pantomime in the 1950s, Babes in the Wood at the Liverpool Empire Theatre.

Stage credits of George Formby
Production	Role	Date	Theatre	Notes
Variety		21 March 1921 –	Hippodrome, Earlestown, Lancashire	First professional appearance; billed as George Hoy
Babes in the Wood		December 1932 –	Bolton	Christmas pantomime
King Cheer		June 1937 –	Opera House Theatre, Blackpool	Summer season
Royal Variety Performance		15 November 1937	London Palladium	A 12-minute slot
Dick Whittington	Idle Jack	1941–1942	Opera House Theatre, Blackpool	Winter season
Zip Goes a Million	Percy Piggott	20 October 1951 – 27 April 1952	Palace Theatre, London	Formby was replaced following a heart attack on 28 April 1952
Fun and the Fair		7 October – 19 December 1953	London Palladium	138 performances
Turned Out Nice Again		25 June 1953 –	Hippodrome Theatre, Blackpool	Six week run
Too Young to Marry		1954–1956	Touring	
Babes in the Wood	Simple Simon	December 1955 –	Liverpool Empire Theatre	Christmas pantomime
Dick Whittington and His Cat	Idle Jack	19 December 1956 – February 1957	Palace Theatre, London	
Beside the Seaside	Wilf Pearson	10 March – 31 May 1958	Touring	12 venues, 96 performances

== Recordings ==
Recordings by Formby
Title	Recording date	Label	Record number	Written by
"John Willie Come On"	11 June 1926	Edison Bell/Winner	4409	George Formby Sr
"I was always a Willing Young Lad"	11 June 1926	Edison Bell/Winner	4409	Hargreaves/Damerell
"I Parted my Hair in the Middle"	11 June 1926	Edison Bell/Winner	4418	David/Murphy
"John Willie's Jazz Band"	11 June 1926	Edison Bell/Winner	4418	Hargreaves/Damerell
"The Man was a Stranger to Me"	11 June 1926	Edison Bell/Winner	4437	Connor
"Rolling around Piccadilly"	11 June 1926	Edison Bell/Winner	4437	Hargreaves/Damerell
"In the Congo"	20 October 1929	Dominion	C347	Cobb/Lutzen
"All Going Back"	20 October 1929	Dominion	C347	Formby
"Do De O Do"	1 July 1932	Decca Records	F3079	Hargreaves/Damerell/Formby
"Chinese Laundry Blues"	1 July 1932	Decca Records	F3079	Cottrell/Formby
"I Told My Baby with the Ukulele"	13 October 1932	Decca Records	F3219	Hargreaves
"If You Don't Want the Goods Don't Maul 'Em"	13 October 1932	Decca Records	F3219	Cottrell
"The Old Kitchen Kettle"	13 October 1932	Decca Records	F3222	Woods/Campbell/Connelly
"John Willie at the Licence Office"	18 October 1932	Decca Records	F3259	Cottrell
"I Could Make a Good Living at That"	9 November 1932	Decca Records	F3377	Lawton/Cottrell
"Let's all Go to Reno"	9 November 1932	Decca Records	F3377	Cottrell
"Sitting on the Ice in the Ice Rink"	29 January 1933	Decca Records	F3458	Cottrell
"Levi's Monkey Mike"	29 January 1933	Decca Records	F3458	Rick/Cottrell
"Running Round the Fountains in Trafalgar Square"	29 January 1933	Decca Records	F3524	Cottrell
"Why Don't Women Like Me?"	29 January 1933	Decca Records	F3524	Cottrell/Bennett
"With my Little Ukulele in my Hand"	1 July 1933	Decca Records	F3615	Cottrell/Formby
"As the Hours and the Days and the Weeks..."	1 July 1933	Decca Records	F3615	Formby
"Sunbathing in the Park"	27 August 1933	Decca Records	F3615	Gifford/Cliff/Kendal
"She's Never Been Seen Since Then"	27 August 1933	Decca Records	F3666	Cottrell
"Swimmin with the Wimmin"	27 August 1933	Decca Records	F3666	Cottrell
"I Went all Hot and Cold"	12 November 1933	Decca Records	F3752	Cottrell, arr Formby
"My Ukulele"	12 November 1933	Decca Records	F3752	Cottrell, arr Formby
"The Wedding of Mr Wu"	12 November 1933	Decca Records	F3800	Cottrell
"Baby"	12 November 1933	Decca Records	F3800	Cottrell
"Believe It or Not"	21 March 1934	Decca Records	F3950	Gifford/Cliffe
"In a Little Wigan Garden"	21 March 1934	Decca Records	F3950	Gifford/Cliffe
"You Can't Keep a Growing Lad Down"	12 June 1934	Decca Records	F5813	Gifford/Cliffe
"It's No Use Looking at Me"	12 June 1934	Decca Records	F5813	Gifford/Cliffe/Cottrell
"John Willie's Jazz Band"	11 October 1934	Decca Records	F5232	Hargreaves/Dammerell
"There's Nothing Proud About Me"	11 October 1934	Decca Records	F5232	Gifford/Cliffe
"The Best of Schemes"	11 October 1934	Decca Records	F5287	Gifford/Cliffe
"Madam Moscovitch"	20 October 1934	Decca Records	F5287	Gifford/Cliffe
"John Willie Goes Carolling"	11 November 1934	Decca Records	F5303	Gifford/Cliffe
"Fanlight Fanny"	29 May 1935	Decca Records	F5569	Gifford/Cliffe
"Share and Share alike"	29 May 1935	Decca Records	F5569	Gifford/Cliffe
"The Fiddler Kept on Fiddling"	29 May 1935	Decca Records	F5669	Gifford/Cliffe
"I Do Do Things I Do"	29 May 1935	Decca Records	F5669	Gibson/Long
"The Isle of Man"	28 November 1935	Regal Zonophone Records	MR1932	Gifford/Cliffe
"Riding in the TT Races"	28 November 1935	Regal Zonophone Records	MR1932	Gifford/Cliffe
"The Pleasure Cruise"	28 November 1935	Regal Zonophone Records	MR1952	Gifford/Cliffe
"The Wash-House at the Back"	28 November 1935	Regal Zonophone Records	MR1952	Gifford/Cliffe
"A Farmer's Boy"	25 February 1936	Regal Zonophone Records	MR2033	Gifford/Cliffe
"Radio Bungalow Town"	25 February 1936	Regal Zonophone Records	MR2033	Gifford/Cliffe
"Gallant Dick Turpin"	25 February 1936	Regal Zonophone Records	MR2060	Gifford/Cliffe
"George Formby Medley"	8 May 1936	Regal Zonophone Records	MR2083	Various
"Ring Your Little Bell"	19 July 1936	Regal Zonophone Records	MR2162	Wallace
"Quickfire Medley"	19 July 1936	Regal Zonophone Records	MR2162	Various
"When I'm Cleaning Windows"	27 September 1936	Regal Zonophone Records	MR2199	Formby/Gifford/Cliffe
"Keep Your Seats Please"	27 September 1936	Regal Zonophone Records	MR2199	Formby/Gifford/Cliffe
"Sitting on the Sands all Night"	27 September 1936	Regal Zonophone Records	MR2232	Formby/Gifford/Cliffe
"Five and Twenty Years"	27 September 1936	Regal Zonophone Records	MR2232	Formby/Gifford/Cliffe
"I'm a Froggie"	29 October 1936	Regal Zonophone Records	MR2270	Hargreaves/Dammerell
"The Ghost"	29 October 1936	Regal Zonophone Records	MR2270	Hargreaves/Dammerell
"Dare Devil Dick"	29 October 1936	Regal Zonophone Records	MR2295	Gifford/Cliffe
"Bunkum's Travelling Show"	29 October 1936	Regal Zonophone Records	MR2295	Gifford/Cliffe
"You're a Li-a-ty"	24 January 1937	Regal Zonophone Records	MR2430	Formby/Gifford/Cliffe
"When we Feather our Nest"	24 January 1937	Regal Zonophone Records	MR2430	Formby/Gifford/Cliffe
"Oh Dear Mother"	24 January 1937	Regal Zonophone Records	MR2431	Formby/Gifford/Cliffe
"With My Little Stick of Blackpool Rock"	24 January 1937	Regal Zonophone Records	MR2431	Formby/Gifford/Cliffe
"Keep Your Seats Please" (Note: Film trailer recording)	14 February 1937	Regal Zonophone Records	IR51	
"Hindoo Man"	14 February 1937	Regal Zonophone Records	MR2368	Formby/Gifford/Cliffe
"My Little Goat and Me"	14 February 1937	Regal Zonophone Records	MR2368	Gifford/Cliffe
"Trailing Around in a Trailer"	14 February 1937	Regal Zonophone Records	MR2469	Gifford/Cliffe
"Said the Little Brown Hen"	14 February 1937	Regal Zonophone Records	MR2469	Formby/Gifford/Cliffe
"The Lancashire Toreador"	21 March 1937	Regal Zonophone Records	MR2399	Formby/Gifford/Cliffe
"The Window Cleaner"	21 March 1937	Regal Zonophone Records	MR2399	Formby/Gifford/Cliffe
"Easy Going Chap"	21 March 1937	Regal Zonophone Records	MR2506	Formby/Gifford/Cliffe
"My Plus Fours"	21 March 1937	Regal Zonophone Records	MR2571	Formby/Gifford/Cliffe
"Somebody's Wedding Day"	11 July 1937	Regal Zonophone Records	MR2506	Formby/Cliffe
"Keep Fit"	11 July 1937	Regal Zonophone Records	MR2570	Formby/Gifford/Cliffe
"Biceps, Muscle and Brawn"	11 July 1937	Regal Zonophone Records	MR2570	Formby/Gifford/Cliffe
"I Don't Like"	11 July 1937	Regal Zonophone Records	MR2571	Formby/Gifford/Cliffe
"Keep Fit" (Note: Film trailer recording)	5 September 1937	Regal Zonophone Records	IR52	
"Leaning on a Lamp-post"	5 September 1937	Regal Zonophone Records	MR2490	Gay
"Hi-Tiddley Hi-Ti Island"	5 September 1937	Regal Zonophone Records	MR2490	Stanley/Alleyn
"Remember Me"	28 November 1937	Regal Zonophone Records	MR2616	Dubin/Warren
"You Can't Stop Me from Dreaming"	28 November 1937	Regal Zonophone Records	MR2628	Friend/Franklyn
"She Can't Say No"	28 November 1937	Regal Zonophone Records	MR2628	Bryan/Meyer
"Does Your Dreambook Tell You That"	6 February 1938	Regal Zonophone Records	MR2684	Formby/Gifford/Cliffe
"Like the Big Pots Do"	6 February 1938	Regal Zonophone Records	MR2684	Long
"Wunga Bunga Boo"	4 March 1938	Regal Zonophone Records	MR2709	Stanley/Alleyn
"Have You Ever Heard This One?"	4 March 1938	Regal Zonophone Records	MR2709	Gilbert
"Springtime's Here Again"	4 March 1938	Regal Zonophone Records	MR2735	Formby/Gifford/Cliffe
"The Joo Jah Tree"	4 March 1938	Regal Zonophone Records	MR2735	Box/Cox/Butler
"I Blew a Little Blast on my Whistle"	4 March 1938	Regal Zonophone Records	MR2753	Formby
"Noughts and Crosses"	3 April 1938	Regal Zonophone Records	MR2752	Campbell/Hunter/Parr-Davies
"Mother what'll I Do Now?"	3 April 1938	Regal Zonophone Records	MR2752	Cliffe/Formby
"In My Little Snapshot Album"	3 April 1938	Regal Zonophone Records	MR2753	Harper/Haines/Parr-Davies
"They Can't Fool Me"	17 July 1938	Regal Zonophone Records	MR2891	Formby/Gifford/Cliffe
"It's in the Air"	17 July 1938	Regal Zonophone Records	MR2891	Parr-Davies
"Sitting Pretty With my Fingers Crossed"	17 July 1938	Regal Zonophone Records	MR2947	Formby/Gifford/Cliffe
"Our Sergeant Major"	17 July 1938	Regal Zonophone Records	MR2890	Formby/Gifford/Cliffe
"Rhythm in the Alphabet"	22 October 1938	Regal Zonophone Records	MR2890	Lisbona/Steller
"Tan-Tan Tivvy Tally-Ho"	22 October 1938	Regal Zonophone Records	MR2925	LeClerq
"I Wonder Who's Under Her Balcony Now"	22 October 1938	Regal Zonophone Records	MR2925	Formby/Gifford/Cliffe
"Kiss Your Mansy Pansy"	22 October 1938	Regal Zonophone Records	MR2947	Formby/Gifford/Cliffe
"Frigid Air Fanny"	11 December 1938	Regal Zonophone Records	MR2969	Formby/Gifford/Cliffe
"Little Wooden Toolshed in the Garden"	11 December 1938	Regal Zonophone Records	MR2969	Stevens/Steele/Wilmott
"Hill Billy Willie"	2 April 1939	Regal Zonophone Records	MR3022	Formby/Gifford/Cliffe
"It's Turned Out Nice Again"	2 April 1939	Regal Zonophone Records	MR3022	Formby/Gifford/Cliffe
"I Can Tell It by My Horoscope"	2 April 1939	Regal Zonophone Records	MR3039	Formby/Gifford/Cliffe
"Hitting the High Spots Now"	2 April 1939	Regal Zonophone Records	MR3039	Formby/Gifford/Cliffe
"I'm the Husband of the Wife of Mr Wu"	18 June 1939	Regal Zonophone Records	MR3081	Formby/Gifford/Cliffe
"It's a Grand and Healthy Life"	18 June 1939	Regal Zonophone Records	MR3081	Formby/Gifford/Cliffe
"Swing It George – Medley"	18 June 1939	Regal Zonophone Records	MR3103	Various
"Goodnight Little Fellow, Goodnight"	27 June 1939	Regal Zonophone Records	MR3160	Formby/Gifford/Cliffe
"Pardon Me"	27 June 1939	Regal Zonophone Records	MR3160	Formby/Frame/ Nicholson
"I'm Making Headway Now"	27 June 1939	Regal Zonophone Records	MR3161	Formby/Gifford/Cliffe
"I Couldn't Let the Stable Down"	27 June 1939	Regal Zonophone Records	MR3161	Formby/Gifford/Cliffe
"Dan the Dairy Man"	20 August 1939	Regal Zonophone Records	MR3121	Formby/Gifford/Cliffe
"The Blue-Eyed Blonde Next Door"	20 August 1939	Regal Zonophone Records	MR3121	Formby/Gifford/Cliffe
"The Lancashire Hot-Pot Swingers"	20 August 1939	Regal Zonophone Records	MR3147	Formby/Gifford/Cliffe
"Low Down Lazy Turk" (Note: "Low Down Lazy Turk" was suppressed in the UK, and released only in Australia.)	20 August 1939	Regal Zonophone Records	G-21917	Formby/Gifford/Cliffe
"Swinging Along"	12 October 1939	Regal Zonophone Records	MR3206	Formby
"A Lad from Lancashire"	12 October 1939	Regal Zonophone Records	MR3206	Formby
"The Lancashire Romeo"	17 December 1939	Regal Zonophone Records	MR3233	Formby/Godfrey
"Imagine Me in the Maginot Line"	17 December 1939	Regal Zonophone Records	MR3233	Formby/Gifford/Cliffe
"Grandad's Flannelette Nightshirt"	17 December 1939	Regal Zonophone Records	MR3301	Formby/Latta
"Mr Wu's a Window Cleaner Now"	17 December 1939	Regal Zonophone Records	MR3301	Formby/Gifford/Cliffe
"Count Your Blessings and Smile"	31 May 1940	Regal Zonophone Records	MR3316	Formby/Gifford/Cliffe
"Oh! Don't the Wind Blow Cold"	31 May 1940	Regal Zonophone Records	MR3316	Formby/Gifford/Cliffe
"You've got Something There"	31 May 1940	Regal Zonophone Records	MR3324	Formby/Gifford/Cliffe
"I Always Get To Bed By Half-Past-Nine"	31 May 1940	Regal Zonophone Records	MR3324	Formby/Gifford/Cliffe
"On the Wigan Boat Express"	4 August 1940	Regal Zonophone Records	MR3325	Formby/Gifford/Cliffe
"Down the Old Coal Hole"	4 August 1940	Regal Zonophone Records	MR3325	Formby/Gifford/Cliffe
"I'm the Ukulele Man"	4 August 1940	Regal Zonophone Records	MR3358	MacDougal
"On the Beat"	4 August 1940	Regal Zonophone Records	MR3358	MacDougal
"Letting the New Year In"	10 November 1940	Regal Zonophone Records	MR3394	Formby/Gifford/Cliffe
"Bless 'Em All"	10 November 1940	Regal Zonophone Records	MR3394	Hughes/Lake
"Guarding the Home of the Home Guard"	10 November 1940	Regal Zonophone Records	MR3411	Latta/Formby
"I Wish I Was Back on the Farm"	10 November 1940	Regal Zonophone Records	MR3411	MacDougal
"Thanks Mr Roosevelt"	21 February 1941	Regal Zonophone Records	MR3441	Connor
"Bless 'Em All"	21 February 1941	Regal Zonophone Records	MR3441	Hughes/Lake
"Formby Favourites for the Forces – Pt 1"	21 February 1941	Regal Zonophone Records	MR3482	Various
"Formby Favourites for the Forces – Pt 2"	21 February 1941	Regal Zonophone Records	MR3482	Various
"You'd be Far Better off in a Home"	8 April 1941	Regal Zonophone Records	MR3463	Box/Cox/Osborne/Javaloyes
"I Did What I Could with my Gas Mask"	8 April 1941	Regal Zonophone Records	MR3463	Leslye/Isaacs
"It Might Have Been a Great Deal Worse"	8 April 1941	Regal Zonophone Records	MR3472	Formby/Gifford/Cliffe
"Delivering the Morning Milk"	28 July 1941	Regal Zonophone Records	MR3472	Formby/Gifford/Cliffe
"The Emperor of Lancashire"	28 July 1941	Regal Zonophone Records	MR3512	MacDougal
"You're Everything to Me"	28 July 1941	Regal Zonophone Records	MR3512	MacDougal
"You Can't Go Wrong in These"	28 July 1941	Regal Zonophone Records	MR3520	MacDougal
"Auntie Maggie's Remedy"	28 July 1941	Regal Zonophone Records	MR3520	Formby/Latta
"The Left Hand Side of Egypt"	24 August 1941	Regal Zonophone Records	MR3521	Bennett/Gay
"Who are you a-Shovin of?"	24 August 1941	Regal Zonophone Records	MR3521	Raymond/Gay
"I'd do it with a Smile"	24 August 1941	Regal Zonophone Records	MR3567	MacDougal
"The Barmaid at the Rose and Crown"	24 August 1941	Regal Zonophone Records	MR3567	Formby
"George Formby's Crazy Record"	5 October 1941	Regal Zonophone Records	MR3550	Various
"I Played On My Spanish Guitar"	5 October 1941	Regal Zonophone Records	MR3553	Lyons
"Swing Mama"	5 October 1941	Regal Zonophone Records	MR3553	MacDougal
"Formby Film Favourites – Pt 1"	6 January 1942	Regal Zonophone Records	MR3599	Various
"Formby Film Favourites – Pt 2"	6 January 1942	Regal Zonophone Records	MR3599	Various
"Frank on His Tank"	12 March 1942	Regal Zonophone Records	MR3619	Formby/Gifford/Cliffe
"Katy Did, Katy Didn't"	12 March 1942	Regal Zonophone Records	MR3619	Loesser/Carmichael
"Smile all the Time"	12 March 1942	Regal Zonophone Records	MR3624	Coady/Formby
"Out in the Middle East"	12 March 1942	Regal Zonophone Records	MR3624	Godfrey
"Got to Get Your Photo in the Press"	31 May 1942	Regal Zonophone Records	MR3640	Latta
"Mister Wu's an Air-Raid Warden Now"	31 May 1942	Regal Zonophone Records	MR3640	Latta
"Talking to the Moon about You"	31 May 1942	Regal Zonophone Records	MR3645	Day
"Andy the Handy Man"	31 May 1942	Regal Zonophone Records	MR3648	Latta
"They Laughed When I Started to Play"	31 May 1942	Regal Zonophone Records	MR3648	Formby/Cliffe
"Thirty Thirsty Sailors"	24 August 1942	Regal Zonophone Records	MR3654	Box/Cox/Leslie
"Hold Your Hats on"	24 August 1942	Regal Zonophone Records	MR3654	Miller/Addinsell
"The Cookhouse Serenade"	11 October 1942	Regal Zonophone Records	MR3663	Goodhart/Twomy
"You Can't Love Two Girls at the Same Time"	11 October 1942	Regal Zonophone Records	MR3663	Formby/Godfrey
"Get Cracking"	11 October 1942	Regal Zonophone Records	MR3689	Formby/Latta
"Under the Blasted Oak"	11 October 1942	Regal Zonophone Records	MR3694	Formby/Cliffe
"When the Waterworks Caught Fire"	17 December 1942	Regal Zonophone Records	MR3672	Formby/Cliffe
"The Baby Show"	17 December 1942	Regal Zonophone Records	MR3672	Wise/Malcolm/Sanford
"Home Guard Blues"	17 December 1942	Regal Zonophone Records	MR3689	Formby/Gifford/Cliffe
"Oh You Have No Idea"	17 December 1942	Regal Zonophone Records	MR3694	Godfrey
"Spotting on the Top of Blackpool Tower"	7 February 1942	Regal Zonophone Records	MR3682	Formby/Windsor/Latta
"Sentimental Lou"	7 February 1942	Regal Zonophone Records	MR3682	Formby/Gifford/Cliffe
"Under the Blasted Oak"	8 July 1943	Regal Zonophone Records	MR3694	Cliffe/Formby
"British Isles Medley"	14 July 1943	Regal Zonophone Records	MR3705	Various
"American Medley"	14 July 1943	Regal Zonophone Records	MR3705	Various
"On the H.M.S. Cowheel"	14 July 1943	Regal Zonophone Records	MR3710	Cliffe/Formby
"Bunty's Such a Big Girl Now"	14 July 1943	Regal Zonophone Records	MR3710	Cliffe/Formby
"If I Had a Girl Like You"	7 November 1943	Regal Zonophone Records	MR3720	Park/Parr-Davies
"Bell Bottom George"	7 November 1943	Regal Zonophone Records	MR3720	Park/Parr-Davies
"It Serves You Right"	7 November 1943	Regal Zonophone Records	MR3723	Box/Cox/Formby
"Swim Little Fish"	10 January 1944	Regal Zonophone Records	MR3723	Park/Parr-Davies
"The 'V' Sign Song"	14 May 1944	Regal Zonophone Records	MR3736	Sievier
"The Old Cane Bottom Chair"	14 May 1944	Regal Zonophone Records	MR3736	Formby/Cliffe
"Our Fanny's Gone all Yankee"	11 November 1944	Regal Zonophone Records	MR3745	Van Dusen
"Unconditional Surrender"	11 November 1944	Regal Zonophone Records	MR3745	Cunningham/Towers
"Blackpool Prom"	11 November 1944	Regal Zonophone Records	MR3750	Sievier
"Mister Wu's in the Airforce"	11 November 1944	Regal Zonophone Records	MR3750	Formby/Latta
"The Daring Young Man"	10 June 1945	Regal Zonophone Records	MR3760	Formby/Cliffe
"I'd Like a Dream Like That"	10 June 1945	Regal Zonophone Records	MR3760	Formby/Cliffe
"She's Got Two of Everything"	10 June 1945	Regal Zonophone Records	MR3761	Cunningham/Towers
"Get Cracking"	16 April 1946	Columbia Records	DX1241	Formby/Latta
"You Don't Need a Licence for That"	23 April 1946	Columbia Records	FB3251	Formby/Cliffe
"The Mad March Hare"	23 April 1946	Columbia Records	FB3251	Formby/Cliffe
"It Could Be"	23 April 1946	Columbia Records	FB3262	Cunningham
"We've Been a Long Time Gone"	23 April 1946	Columbia Records	FB3262	Formby/Cliffe
"Come Hither With Your Zither"	12 January 1950	Decca Records	F9356	Miller/Noel/Donnelly
"Auntie Maggie's Remedy"	21 January 1950	Decca Records	F9356	Formby/Latta
"Leaning on a Lamp-post"	21 January 1950	Decca Records	F9444	Gay
"When I'm Cleaning Windows"	21 January 1950	Decca Records	F9444	Formby/Gifford/Cliffe
"I'm Saving Up For Sally"	5 November 1951	His Master's Voice	B10179	Posford/Maschwitz/Littler
"The Pleasure Cruise"	5 November 1951	His Master's Voice	B10179	Gifford/Cliffe
"Ordinary People"	5 November 1951	His Master's Voice	B10180	Posford/Maschwitz/Littler
"Zip Goes a Million"	5 November 1951	His Master's Voice	B10180	Posford/Maschwitz/Littler
"Happy Go Lucky Me"	11 May 1960	Pye	7N-15269	Evans/Byron
"Banjo Boy"	11 May 1960	Pye	7N-15269	Niessen/Kay

== Radio ==
Radio broadcasts of Formby
Broadcast	Date	Channel	Notes
King Fun	August 1936	BBC Radio	
A Lancashire Lad	January 1938	BBC Radio	Ran for several months
Formby Do	19 May 1938	BBC Radio	Three programmes
Troop Concert	26 March 1940	BBC Radio	Recorded in France
Ack-Ack, Beer-Beer	24 July 1940	BBC Radio	Interview only
Let the People Sing	27 November 1940	BBC Radio	Recorded for ENSA at Aldwych tube station
What is the Stuff to give the Troops	10 May 1942	BBC Radio	Recorded for ENSA
The RAF takes the Air	22 July 1942	BBC Radio	Recorded for ENSA
unknown	24 January 1944	BBC Radio	Formby described his experiences touring for ENSA in Europe and the Middle East.
Interview	17 September 1947	Radio IZB, Auckland, New Zealand	
Interview	24 September 1947	BBC Radio	
Interview	26 September 1947	2GB, Sydney	Recorded at Rosebay Flying Boat Base, Sydney
Stage Door	January 1948	3AW, Melbourne, Australia	Interview
Interview	3 October 1949	CKOC, Hamilton, ON, Canada	
Interview	2 November 1949	CHUB, Nanaimo, BC, Canada	
Bill Ward's Dog House	3 November 1949	CKWX, Vancouver, BC, Canada	Interview
Midnite Merry-Go-Round	3 November 1949	CKXL, Calgary, Alberta, Canada	
Desert Island Discs	20 November 1951	BBC Radio	Bing Crosby, "McNamara's Band"; Josef Locke, "Hear My Song, Violetta"; Vera Lynn, "Be Like the Kettle and Sing"; Tennessee Ernie Ford, "The Shot Gun Boogie"; Philharmonia Orchestra, "Londonderry Air"; John McCormack, "The Kerry Dance"; Phil Harris and His Orchestra, "Never Trust a Woman"; George Formby, Sr., "Standing on the Corner of the Street"; his luxury item was his first ukulele.
In Town Tonight	5 October 1953	BBC Light Programme	
Pied Piper	12 March 1955	BBC Light Programme	Interviewed by Eamonn Andrews
In Town Tonight	16 April 1955	BBC Light Programme	
Winnipeg Flood Relief Charity Show	May 1955	CBC Radio	

== Television ==
Television appearances of George Formby
Programme	Date	Channel	Role	Notes
Christmas Greetings	1938		On-screen participant	
Ask Pickles	1954	BBC Television	On-screen participant	
Top of the Town	9 January 1955	BBC Television	On-screen participant	Included a duet of "Leaning on a Lamp-post" with Terry-Thomas
Dick Whittington	January 1957	BBC Television	On-screen participant	
Val Parnell's Saturday Spectacular	15 June 1957	ITV	On-screen participant	
Top of the Bill	5 October 1957	ITV	On-screen participant	
The Frankie Vaughan Show	18 January 1958	BBC Television	On-screen participant	
Many Happy Returns	15 February 1958	ITV	On-screen participant	
George Formby Presents: Formby Favourites	6 September 1958	BBC Television	Host	
Val Parnell's Spectacular: The Atlantic Showboat	10 January 1959	ITV	On-screen participant	
Steppin' Out With Formby	25 April 1959	BBC Television	On-screen participant	
Showtime	29 November 1959	BBC Television	On-screen participant	
The Time of your Life	14 July 1960	BBC Television	On-screen participant	Excerpts from Formby's last summer show at the Queen's Theatre, Blackpool
The Friday Show: George Formby	16 December 1960	BBC Television	On-screen participant	

== Sources ==
=== Books ===
- Bret, David (1999). George Formby: A Troubled Genius. London: Robson Books. ISBN 978-1-86105-239-1.
- Fisher, John (1975). George Formby. London: Woburn-Futura. ISBN 978-0-7130-0139-6.
- Magee, Sean (2012). Desert Island Discs: 70 Years of Castaways. London: Random House. ISBN 978-0-593-07006-2.
- McCann, Graham (2009). Bounder! The Biography of Terry-Thomas. London: Aurum Press. ISBN 978-1-84513-441-9.
- Randall, Alan; Seaton, Ray (1974). George Formby. London: W. H. Allen. ISBN 978-0-491-01771-8.
- Richards, Jeffrey (2004). "Formby, George [real name George Hoy Booth]". Oxford Dictionary of National Biography (online ed.). Oxford University Press. doi:10.1093/ref:odnb/33205. (Subscription, Wikipedia Library access or UK public library membership required.)
- Richards, Jeffrey (2010). The Age of the Dream Palace: Cinema and Society in 1930s Britain. London: I.B. Tauris. ISBN 978-1-84885-122-1.
- Ryan, Brendan (1986). George Formby: A Catalogue of his Work. Dublin: The George Formby Society. OCLC 40991236.
- Smart, Sue; Bothway Howard, Richard (2011). It's Turned Out Nice Again!: The Authorized Biography of the Two George Formbys, Father and Son. Ely, Cambridgeshire: Melrose Books. ISBN 978-1-907732-59-1.

=== Newspapers ===
- "Theatres and Cinemas". Hull Daily Mail. 14 March 1958. p. 8.
- Bryson, Emrys (21 May 1958). "George Formby Back Again". The Guardian Journal.
