= Delivering the Morning Milk =

1941 song performed by George Formby

"Delivering the Morning Milk" is a comic song written by George Formby, Harry Gifford and Frederick E. Cliffe. Formby recorded it on 28 July 1941 for Regal Zonophone Records. The song is similar to Formby's signature tune, "The Window Cleaner", only now he now describes the various sights he sees, often of a sexual nature, while out on his milk round.
