= He Snoops to Conquer =

- Directed by: Marcel Varnel
- Written by: Stephen Black; Norman Lee; Howard Irving Young; Langford Reed
- Produced by: Marcel Varnel; Ben Henry
- Starring: George Formby; Robertson Hare; Elizabeth Allan
- Cinematography: Roy Fogwell
- Edited by: Max Brenner
- Music by: Harry Bidgood; Eddie Latta
- Production company: Columbia Pictures
- Distributed by: Columbia Pictures
- Release date: 12 December 1944
- Running time: 103 mins
- Country: United Kingdom
- Language: English

He Snoops to Conquer is a 1944 British comedy film directed by Marcel Varnel starring George Formby, Robertson Hare, Elizabeth Allan and Claude Bailey. It was written by Stephen Black, Norman Lee, Howard Irving Young and Langford Reed. Its plot involves an odd job man who becomes mixed up in corruption in politics and town planning. Its title is a pun on the theatre comedy She Stoops to Conquer.

== Plot ==
After being ordered to do a piece on town planning two newspapermen randomly pick on the small, industrial town of Tangleton. After arriving at the town hall the only man they can find working is the odd job man, George Gribble, who gives them a guided tour of the town. However, they run a negative angle on the story highlighting the fact that the wealthy leader of the council, Mr Oxbold, lives in a giant house by himself while Gribble is one of fourteen staying in a tiny slum house. When they read the article, the town's leaders order Gribble to do a public opinion investigation around the town. Instead of doing a cross section as ordered, he interviews the entire town's population. The results he produces shock the town's complacent leaders, who discover the people are deeply unhappy with the status quo and wants radical changes in living conditions and other services. This is a blow to the council leader and his colleagues who all have financial interests in keeping the town as it is. Oxbold is a slum landlord who fears a Whitehall scheme to demolish much of the existing town and rebuild it with council houses. To avert this, Oxbold and his colleagues decide to send off to London only those limited number of forms which praise the current situation. Gribble is ordered to burn the rest but, not wishing to waste paper, he puts them out for salvage instead.

Gribble had agreed to conduct the polling in return for being paid £27.10s (decimal equivalent: £27.50), which he needed to give to a loan shark. However, facing upcoming municipal elections with a clearly unpopular the town's leader decides to invite the inventor Sir Timothy Strawbridge to stand for the council to boost its popularity. Strawbridge is a wealthy, reclusive, eccentric who enjoys popularity in the town because of his extensive Philanthropy. Strawbridge was the only man who did not respond to the polling because Gribble could not get past the door by the butler. Gribble is told he cannot have his money until he completes his survey and is sent off to find out of Strawbridge has sound opinions, but again fails to get into the house. He then enjoys a chance meeting with Strawbridge in the street, when after a mishap, they find themselves careering through the town on the road sweeper. Gribble accidentally presses a button that releases all the unfavourable polling forms through the street. To avoid the police on their tail they go and shelter in Strawbridge's house, where Gribble meets Strawbridge's daughter Jane who he is immediately smitten by.

Despite finally persuading Strawbridge to fill out his form Gribble is sacked by his bosses when they discover that it was he who originally showed the newspapermen round the town. His problems mount when he is beset by an angry mob of townspeople who have found the abandoned forms on the street and blame Gribble for the cover up. He is also pursued by a bailiff for the money he owes. However, Jane comes up with the idea of Gribble running for the council on a pro-town planning platform. With the support of the newspaper, he soon builds up a head of steam and looks likely to be elected. Oxbold and his colleagues plan to top this by getting their hands on the forms to destroy the evidence of their dishonesty. After Gribbles' furniture is possessed by the bailiffs including the vase where he had stored the forms, he takes part in a desperate race against the clock in order to recover them and produce them at a major town planning conference. Gribble fails to recover them but is saved by Strawbridge who had recorded them electronically. The film ends with the crooked councillors exposed and Gribble being hailed by the people.

== Cast ==
- George Formby as George Gribble
- Robertson Hare as Sir Timothy Strawbridge
- Elizabeth Allan as Jane Strawbridge
- Claude Bailey as Councillor Oxbold
- James Harcourt as Councillor Hopkins
- Aubrey Mallalieu as Councillor Stubbins
- Gordon McLeod as Angus McGluee
- Vincent Holman as Butler
- Katie Johnson as Ma, George's landlady

== Reception and analysis ==
The Monthly Film Bulletin wrote: "This film is a strange mixture of extravagant, not very funny farce and quite effective denunciation of bad housing and corrupt town councils. Direction and photography are good; Formby is quite amusing as the naive George; Robertson Hare is not very funny in a ridiculous part."

Kine Weekly wrote: "Cheery, topical small-town slapstick comedy, flavoured at the finish with a touch of wholesome vulgarity ... George Formby gives a versatile performance in the lead, Robertson Hare and Elizabeth Allan contribute valuable and strenuous support, and the many elaborate mechanical gadgets and gags are laughably put over. Some of the supplementary cracks and situatians are less funny, and the romantic interludes are a trifle awkward, but the overall impression is, nevertheless, good Formby."

TV Guide concluded the film is a "not very good outing for Formby".

Halliwell's Film Guide called it a "spotty star comedy with insufficient zest for its great length."

In Masculinities in British Cinema, Andrew Spicer wrote that Formby "personified a cheery, comic 'little man', who, despite his bumbling stupidity, has gumption and the will-to-win; in Let George Do It! he even punches Hitler on the nose. But although Formby provided what Mass-Observation thought was vital for public morale in the 'dark days' of the war, comic relief, his popularity declined rapidly at the end of the war. Neither He Snoops to Conquer (1944) or George in Civvy Street (1946), which attempted to align Formby with social change and reconstruction was successful".
