= It Serves You Right =

1943 British comic song by George Formby

"It Serves You Right" (also known as "You Shouldn't Have Joined") is a 1943 British comic song associated with the British comedian George Formby. The song features a sailor in the Royal Navy lamenting the downsides of service life. Despite this the tone of the song is cheerful and upbeat.

It was recorded by Formby for Regal Zonophone Records in November 1943. The song is featured in the 1943 Formby film Bell-Bottom George in which he appears as a waiter masquerading as a naval rating. Formby's song establishes an instant camaraderie with his fellow sailors which until then has been lacking. In 1944 Formby was brought before the Dance Music Policy Committee who alleged that this song amongst others in the film contained "enemy-friendly lyrics".
