= On the Beat (song) =

"On the Beat" is a British song written by Roger MacDougall and sung by the comedian George Formby. It was recorded by Formby on 4 August 1940 for Regal Zonophone Records. It is sung by Formby in the 1940 film Spare a Copper. Formby plays a War Reserve Constable in Liverpool, and sings it at a fundraising concert.

It includes some of the chords of the popular music hall song “Ask a Policeman”.
