= By the Shortest of Heads =

1915 British film by Bert Haldane

- Directed by: Bert Haldane
- Produced by: Barker Motion Photography
- Starring: George Formby
- Release date: 1915
- Country: United Kingdom

By the Shortest of Heads is a lost 1915 British film directed by Bert Haldane and starring George Formby. It was Formby's first film; he was aged ten at the time.

== Plot ==
A stable boy outwits a gang of villains and wins a £10,000 prize when he comes first in a horse race.

== Cast ==
- George Formby as Tony Dawson
- Jack Tessier as Eric Dawson
- Moore Marriott as Captain Fields
- Jack Hulcup as Geoffrey Warrington
- Percy Manton as Squire Markham

== Background ==
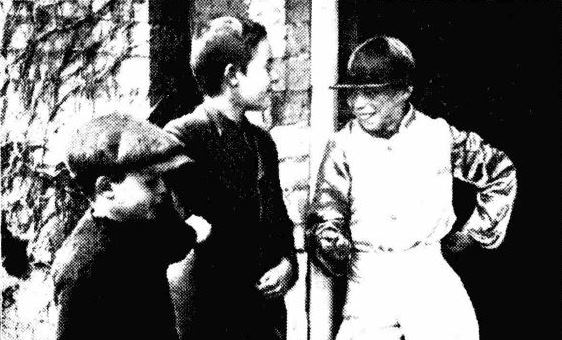
Formby while employed as a jockey, aged 10 in 1915

George Formby Snr was worried that his son, George Formby, would watch him on stage and begin a career on stage; he was against the boy following in his footsteps, saying "one fool in the family is enough". After a year of Formby working at a stables in Middleham, he was apprenticed to Thomas Scourfield at Epsom, where he ran his first professional races at the age of 10, when he weighed less than 4 stone (56 lb; 25 kg). In 1915 Formby Snr allowed his son to appear on screen, taking the lead in By the Shortest of Heads. After completing the filming, Formby Jnr was sent to Ireland to continue his jockey training, as were the five horses Formby had purchased that year, which joined others he had previously bought.

== Preservation status ==
The film is now considered lost, with the last-known copy having been destroyed in 1940. The British Film Institute National Archive holds no stills or ephemera, and no film or video materials.

== Sources ==
- Bret, David (1999). George Formby: A Troubled Genius. London: Robson Books. ISBN 978-1-86105-239-1.
- Fisher, John (1975). George Formby. London: Woburn-Futura. ISBN 978-0-7130-0139-6.
- Smart, Sue; Bothway Howard, Richard (2011). It's Turned Out Nice Again!. Ely, Cambridgeshire: Melrose Books. ISBN 978-1-907732-59-1.
