= Split stroke =

Style of ukulele playing

The split stroke is a style of playing the ukulele which is peculiar to the George Formby style of playing. It is a syncopated rhythm where the player will strike all of the strings, and then on the return, catch the first string, and then before starting again hit the last string:

(Example is the chord 'C')
3..3
0
0
0..-..0

This stroke is often used alongside the finger-tap where the player will either remove their finger from the fret on the first string:

(Example is the chord 'C')
3..0
0
0
0..-..0

or, with some other chords, tap their little finger onto the second or third fret along the fretboard from the one currently being used.

(Example is the chord 'G7')
5..2
1
2
0..-..0

[Examples are noted in a similar form to tabs]

The name 'split' comes from the timing with which the stroke is most commonly used; being 'split-common' time (2/2).

Variations on the split stroke include the shake, which, in essence, is playing the split very fast, without lifting the playing finger away from the vellum, thus creating a shaking sound in between the accented beats of the rhythm. Also, there is another stroke called the circle, which was the original syncopated stroke for the ukulele, and was first introduced by Alvin Keech, who is the person credited with having introduced ukulele-banjos.
