= Under the Blasted Oak =

Song by George Formby

"Under the Blasted Oak" is a comic song written by George Formby and Frederick E. Cliffe. Formby recorded it on 11 October 1942 for Regal Zonophone Records. It tells a humorous "ghost story" about the attempts of Formby and his girlfriend to find a buried stash of money, hidden by a miser under a blasted Oak Tree. The miser makes an apparently ghostly appearance, only to turn out to be wearing a bed sheet.

The song features in Formby's 1943 film Get Cracking.

== Bibliography ==
- Gammond, Peter. The Oxford Companion to Popular Music. Oxford University Press, 1991.
- Richards, Jeffrey. The Age of the Dream Palace. I.B. Tauris, 2010.
