= Get Cracking =

1943 film by Marcel Varnel

- Theatrical release poster
- Directed by: Marcel Varnel
- Screenplay by: Edward Dryhurst
- Produced by: Marcel Varnel
- Starring: E.V.H. Emmett; George Formby; Edward Rigby
- Cinematography: Stephen Dade
- Edited by: Max Brenner
- Music by: Harry Bidgood
- Production company: Columbia (British) Productions
- Release date: 3 May 1943
- Running time: 97 minutes
- Country: United Kingdom
- Language: English

Get Cracking is a 1943 British comedy war film, directed by Marcel Varnel and starring George Formby, with Dinah Sheridan and Ronald Shiner. It was written by Edward Dryhurst, L. Du Garde Peach, Michael Vaughan and John L. Arthur. It was produced by Varnel and Ben Henry for Columbia (British) Productions, a subsidiary of the American studio.

The film opens like a World War Two documentary with a narrator explaining the action, before becoming a more traditional Formby vehicle.

== Synopsis ==
Mechanic and Home Guard lance corporal George Singleton has an adversary in a fellow Home Guard, Everett Manley. When the rival Home Guard units of Major Wallop and Minor Wallop are sent on battle manoeuvres, George launches his own unique style of commando raid against neighbouring Major Wallop to steal a Vickers machine gun. The raid fails and Singleton loses his lance corporal stripe, so he and a little evacuee girl named Irene decide to build their very own tank. The venture is such a success that George is made a sergeant.

== Cast ==
- George Formby as George Singleton
- Dinah Sheridan as Mary Pemberton
- Edward Rigby as Sam Elliott
- Frank Pettingell as Alf Pemberton
- Ronald Shiner as Everett Manley
- Wally Patch as Sergeant Joe Preston
- Mike Johnson as Josh
- Irene Handl as Maggie Turner
- Vera Frances as Irene
- Frank Atkinson as Station Master
- Ben Williams as Home Guard member
- Harry Fowler (uncredited)
- E. V. H. Emmett as narrator

== Songs ==
The film includes three songs: "Under the Blasted Oak" (Formby, Frederick E. Cliffe), "Home Guard Blues" (Cliffe, Fred Godfrey, Formby) and "Get Cracking" (Eddie Latta, Formby).

== Release ==
The film was released on 17 May 1943.

== Reception ==
=== Box office ===
The film earned £139,043 to distributors in the UK.

=== Critical ===
The Monthly Film Bulletin wrote: "Thanks to a reasonable script, this is a better comedy than George Formby has ever made before. It has many good lines, a number of clever and amusing situations and a certain air of crazy possibility."

Kine Weekly wrote: "Clean, refreshing, typically English comedy ... The story, which, incidentally, gives George Formby his best role for some considerable time, is kept cracking; the supporting characterisation is excellent; the sentiment, both romantic and patriotic, is unaffected; the dialogue natural, and the climax, satire and slapstick at their best."
