= Eddie Latta =

British songwriter (1902–1972)

Eddie Latta was the songwriting name of Bruce Alfred Williams (23 November 1902 – September 1972 in Liverpool), a Liverpool undertaker who wrote songs for the Lancashire film actor and music hall artist George Formby, among others.

Among the songs he wrote for Formby's films were "Grandad's Flannelette Nightshirt" from Let George Do It! (1940), "Auntie Maggies Remedy" from Turned Out Nice Again (1941), "Andy The Handy Man" from Much Too Shy (1942), "Get Cracking", from the 1943 film Get Cracking, and "Got To Get Your Photo in The Press" from the film He Snoops to Conquer (1944).

Other songs he wrote for Formby include "Maxie The Taxi Driver", "Sitting on the Top of Blackpool Tower" (1936), and "Mr Wu's An Air Raid Warden Now" (1942).

With his brother he ran his business, Williams Funeral Directors, from a site on the corner of Hartington Road in Liverpool. Because of his close association with Formby, Williams was chosen to make the funeral arrangements on Formby's death in 1961.

He was interviewed for the 1967 documentary The Life and Wartimes of George Formby.
