= George Formby =

English actor, singer-songwriter and comedian (1904–1961)

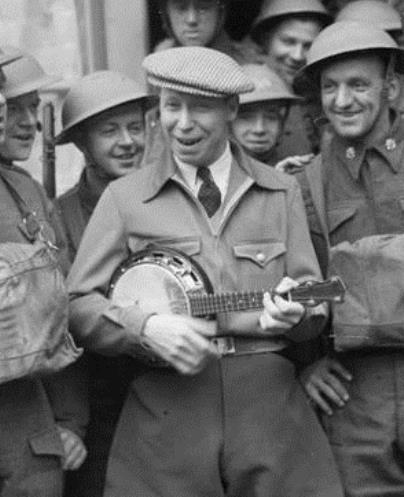
Formby in France during the Second World War

George Formby (born George Hoy Booth; 26 May 1904 – 6 March 1961) was an English actor, singer-songwriter and comedian who became known to a worldwide audience through his films of the 1930s and 1940s. On stage, screen and record he sang light, comic songs, usually accompanying himself on the ukulele or banjolele, and became the UK's highest-paid entertainer.

Born in Wigan, Lancashire, he was the son of George Formby Sr, from whom he later took his stage name. After an early career as a stable boy and jockey, Formby took to the music hall stage after the early death of his father in 1921. His early performances were taken exclusively from his father's act, including the same songs, jokes and characters. In 1923 he made two career-changing decisions – he purchased a ukulele, and married Beryl Ingham, a fellow performer who became his manager and transformed his act. She insisted that he appear on stage formally dressed, and introduced the ukulele to his performance. He started his recording career in 1926 and, from 1934, he increasingly worked in film to develop into a major star by the late 1930s and 1940s, and became the UK's most popular entertainer during those decades. The film historian Brian McFarlane writes that on film, Formby portrayed gormless Lancastrian innocents who would win through against some form of villainy, gaining the affection of an attractive middle-class girl in the process.

During the Second World War, Formby worked extensively for the Entertainments National Service Association (ENSA), and entertained civilians and troops, and by 1946 it was estimated that he had performed in front of three million service personnel. After the war, his career declined, although he toured the Commonwealth, and continued to appear in variety and pantomime. His last television appearance was in December 1960, two weeks before the death of Beryl. He surprised people by announcing his engagement to a school teacher, Pat Howson, seven weeks after Beryl's funeral, but died in Preston three weeks later, at the age of 56; he was buried in Warrington, alongside his father.

Formby's biographer, Jeffrey Richards, considers that the actor "had been able to embody simultaneously Lancashire, the working classes, the people, and the nation". Formby was considered Britain's first properly home-grown screen comedian. He was an influence on future comedians—particularly Charlie Drake and Norman Wisdom—and, culturally, on entertainers such as the Beatles, who referred to him in their music. Since his death, Formby has been the subject of numerous biographies, television specials and two works of public sculpture.

== Biography ==
=== Early life: 1904–1921 ===
Formby's father, George Sr

George Formby was born George Hoy Booth in Wigan, Lancashire, on 26 May 1904. He was the eldest of seven surviving children born to James Lawler Booth and his wife Eliza, née Hoy, although this marriage was bigamous because Booth was still married to his first wife, Martha Maria Salter, a twenty-year-old music hall performer. Booth was a successful music hall comedian and singer who performed under the name George Formby (he is now known as George Formby Sr). Formby Sr suffered from a chest ailment, identified variously as bronchitis, asthma or tuberculosis, and would use the cough as part of the humour in his act, saying to the audience, "Bronchitis, I'm a bit tight tonight", or "coughing better tonight". One of his main characters was that of John Willie, an "archetypal Lancashire lad". In 1906 Formby Sr was earning £35 a week at the music halls, which rose to £325 a week by 1920, and Formby grew up in an affluent home. (Note: Formby Sr's weekly salary of £35 in 1906 is approximately £3,188 in 2014; the £325 weekly salary in 1920 is approximately £15,000.) Formby Sr was so popular that Marie Lloyd, the influential music hall singer and actress, would only watch two acts: his and that of Dan Leno.

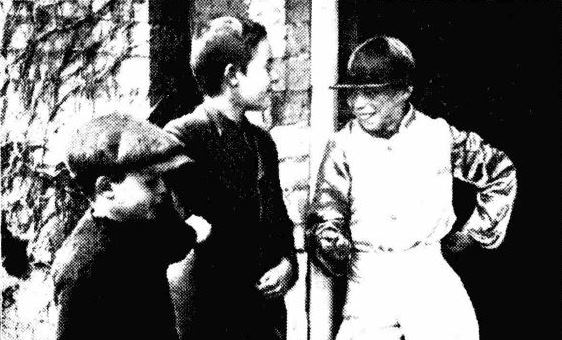
Formby while employed as a jockey, aged 10 in 1915

Formby was born blind owing to an obstructive caul, although his sight was restored during a violent coughing fit or sneeze when he was a few months old. After briefly attending school—at which he did not prosper, and did not learn to read or write—Formby was removed from formal education at the age of seven and sent to become a stable boy, briefly in Wiltshire and then in Middleham, Yorkshire. Formby Sr sent his son away to work as he was worried Formby would watch him on stage; he was against Formby following in his footsteps, saying "one fool in the family is enough". After a year working at Middleham, he was apprenticed to Thomas Scholfield at Epsom, where he ran his first professional races at the age of 10, when he weighed less than 4 stone (56 lb; 25 kg).

In 1915 Formby Sr allowed his son to appear on screen, taking the lead in By the Shortest of Heads, a thriller directed by Bert Haldane in which Formby played a stable boy who outwits a gang of villains and wins a £10,000 prize when he comes first in a horse race. The film is now considered lost, with the last-known copy having been destroyed in 1940. Later in 1915, and with the closure of the English racing season because of the First World War, Formby moved to Ireland where he continued as a jockey until November 1918. Later that month he returned to England and raced for Lord Derby at his Newmarket stables. Formby continued as a jockey until 1921, although he never won a race.

=== Beginning a stage career: 1921–1934 ===
Formby in the early 1920s, when still playing John Willie

On 8 February 1921 Formby Sr succumbed to his bronchial condition and died, at the age of 45; he was buried in the Catholic section of Warrington Cemetery. After his father's funeral Eliza took the young Formby to London to help him cope with his grief. While there, they visited the Victoria Palace Theatre—where Formby Sr had previously been so successful—and saw a performance by the Tyneside comedian Tommy Dixon. (Note: The performer has also been named as George Bass. There were several Formby Sr tribute acts in operation at the time.) Dixon was performing a copy of Formby Sr's act, using the same songs, jokes, costumes and mannerisms, and billed himself as "The New George Formby", a name which angered Eliza and Formby even more. The performance prompted Formby to follow in his father's profession, a decision which was supported by Eliza. As he had never seen his father perform live, Formby found the imitation difficult and had to learn his father's songs from records, and the rest of his act and jokes from his mother.

On 21 March 1921 Formby gave his first professional appearance in a two-week run at the Hippodrome in Earlestown, Lancashire, where he received a fee of £5 a week. In the show he was billed as George Hoy, using his mother's maiden name—he explained later that he did not want the Formby name to appear in small print. His father's name was used in the posters and advertising, George Hoy being described as "Comedian. (son of George Formby)". While still appearing in Earlestown Formby was hired to appear at the Moss Empire chain of theatres for £17 10s a week. His first night was unsuccessful and he later said of it, "I was the first turn, three minutes, died the death of a dog". He toured around venues in Northern England, although he was not well received, and was booed and hissed while performing in Blyth, Northumberland. As a result he experienced frequent periods of unemployment—up to three months at one point. Formby spent two years as a support act touring round the northern halls, and although he was poorly paid, his mother supported him financially.

In 1923 Formby started to play the ukulele, although the exact circumstances of how he came to play the instrument are unknown, (Note: There are numerous versions of the story surrounding Formby's purchase of the ukulele, including that it was obtained while it was appearing in revue, from a hard-up fellow performer for 50 shillings, in any one of Bolton, Barnsley, Bradford or Aberdeen. It is also reported that he purchased it from a shop in Manchester for 15 shillings.) and he introduced it into his act during a run at the Alhambra Theatre in Barnsley. When the songs—still his father's material—were well received, he changed his stage name to George Formby, and stopped using the John Willie character. Another significant event was his appearance in Castleford, West Yorkshire, where appearing on the same bill was Beryl Ingham, an Accrington-born champion clogdancer and actress who had won the All England Step Dancing title at the age of 11. Beryl, who had formed a dancing act with her sister, May, called "The Two Violets", had a low opinion of Formby's act, and later said that "if I'd had a bag of rotten tomatoes with me I'd have thrown them at him". Formby and Beryl entered into a relationship and married two years later, on 13 September 1924, at a register office in Wigan, with Formby's aunt and uncle as witnesses. Upon hearing the news, Eliza insisted on the couple having a church wedding, which followed two months later.

An advertisement from The Burnley News, May 1921 for George Hoy

Beryl took over as George's manager, and changed aspects of his act, including the songs and jokes. She instructed him on how to use his hands, and how to work his audience. She also persuaded him to change his stage dress to black tie—although he appeared in a range of other costumes too—and to take lessons in how to play the ukulele properly. By June 1926 he was proficient enough to earn a one-off record deal—negotiated by Beryl—to sing six of his father's songs for the Edison Bell/Winner label. Formby spent the next few years touring, largely in the north, but also appearing at the Shepherd's Bush Empire, his official London debut. Although he had a further recording session in October 1929, performing two songs for Dominion Records, "Beryl's avaricious demands would prevent any serious contract from coming George's way", according to David Bret, Formby's biographer. That changed in 1932, when Formby signed a three-year deal with Decca Records. One of the songs he recorded in July was "Chinese Laundry Blues", telling the story of Mr Wu, which became one of his standard songs, and part of a long-running series of songs about the character. (Note: The other songs are "The Wedding of Mr Wu", "I'm the Husband of the Wife of Mr Wu", "Mr Wu's a Window Cleaner Now", "Mr Wu's an Air Raid Warden Now" and "Mr Wu was in the Air Force".) Over the course of his career Formby went on to record over 200 songs, around 90 of which were written by Fred Cliffe and Harry Gifford. In the 1932 winter season Formby appeared in his first pantomime, Babes in the Wood, in Bolton, after which he toured with the George Formby Road Show around the north of England, with Beryl acting as the commère; the show also toured in 1934.

=== Burgeoning film career: 1934–1940 ===
With Formby's growing success on stage, Beryl decided it was time for him to move into films. In 1934 she approached the producer Basil Dean, the head of Associated Talking Pictures (ATP). Although he expressed an interest in Formby, he did not like the associated demands from Beryl. She also met the representative of Warner Bros. in the UK, Irving Asher, who was dismissive, saying that Formby was "too stupid to play the bad guy and too ugly to play the hero". Three weeks later Formby was approached by John E. Blakeley of Blakeley's Productions, who offered him a one-film deal.

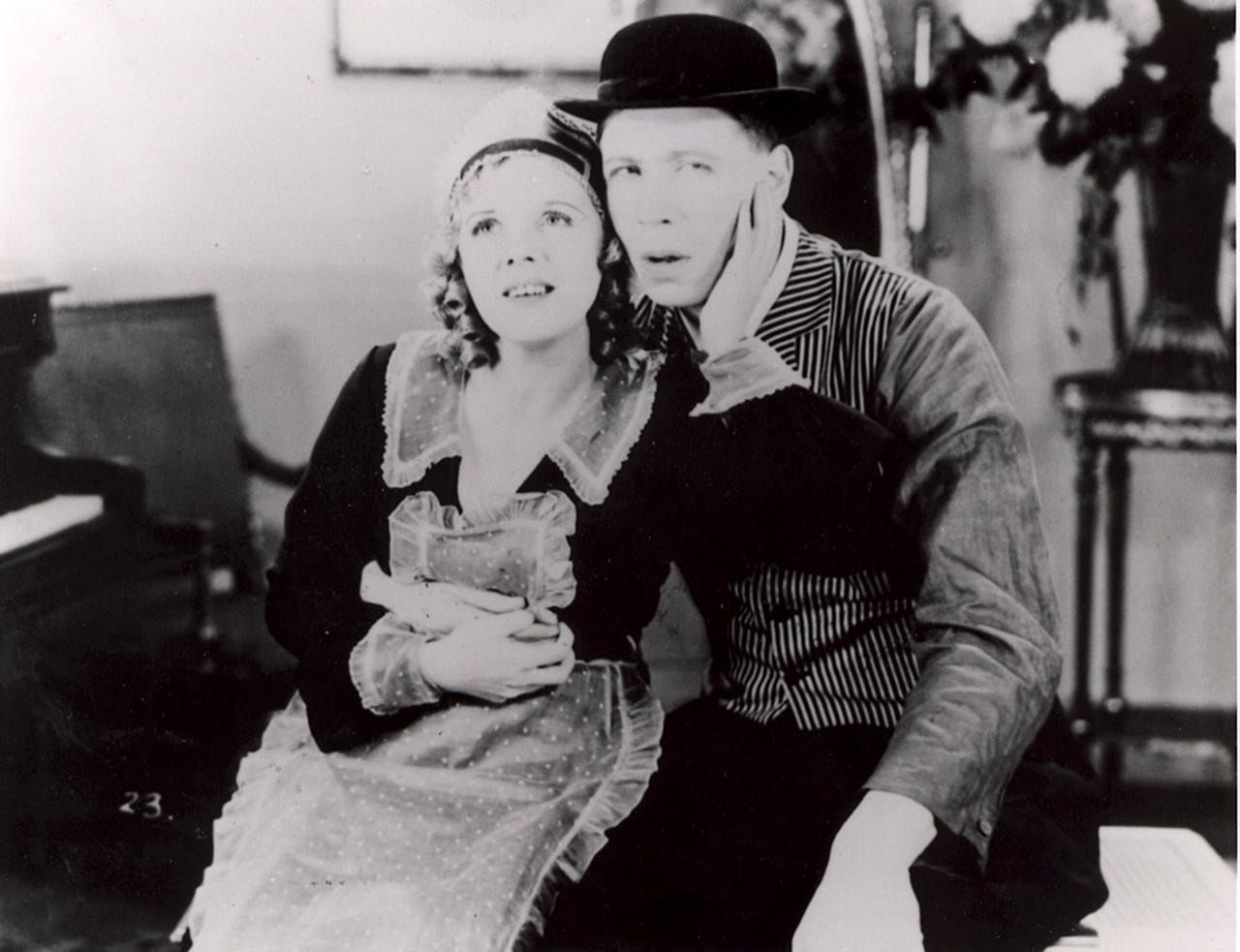
George and Beryl Formby in Boots! Boots!, 1934

The film, Boots! Boots!, was shot on a budget of £3,000 in a one-room studio in Albany Street, London. Formby played the John Willie character, while Beryl also appeared, and the couple were paid £100 for the two weeks' work, plus 10 per cent of the profits. (Note: Bret puts the salary for both Formbys at £200.) The film followed a revue format, and Jo Botting, writing for the British Film Institute, describes it as having a "wafer-thin plot" that is "almost incidental". Botting also considers the film has "poor sound quality, static scene set-ups and [a] lack of sets", and while it did not impress the critics, audience figures were high. Formby followed this up with Off the Dole in 1935, again for Blakeley, who had re-named his company Mancunian Films. The film cost £3,000 to make, and earned £80,000 at the box office. As with Boots! Boots!, the film was in a revue format, and Formby again played John Willie, with Beryl as his co-star. According to Formby's biographer, Jeffrey Richards, the two films for Blakeley "are an invaluable record of the pre-cinematic Formby at work".

The success of the pictures led Dean to offer Formby a seven-year contract with ATP, which resulted in the production of 11 films, although Dean's fellow producer, Michael Balcon, considered Formby to be "an odd and not particularly loveable character". The first film from the deal was released in 1935. No Limit features Formby as an entrant in the Isle of Man annual Tourist Trophy (TT) motorcycle race. Monty Banks directed, and Florence Desmond took the female lead. (Note: Formby and Desmond disliked each other, with Formby calling her a "snotty-nosed little minx"; she thought he was a "dreadful, slobbering little oaf".) According to Richards, Dean did not try "to play down Formby's Lancashire character" for the film, and employed Walter Greenwood, the Salford-born author of the 1933 novel Love on the Dole, as the scriptwriter. Filming was troubled, with Beryl being difficult to everyone present. The writer Matthew Sweet describes the set as "a battleground" because of her actions, and Banks unsuccessfully requested that Dean bar Beryl from the studio. The Observer thought that parts of No Limit were "pretty dull stuff", but the race footage was "shot and cut to a maximum of excitement". Regarding the star of the film, the reviewer thought that "our Lancashire George is a grand lad; he can gag and clown, play the banjo and sing with authority ... Still and all, he doesn't do too bad." The film was so popular it was reissued in 1938, 1946 and 1957.

The formula used for No Limit was repeated in his following works: Formby played "the urban 'little man' defeated—but refusing to admit it". (Note: Also described as a "hapless 'everyman' character who manages to prevail against overwhelming odds".) He portrayed a good-natured, but accident-prone and incompetent Lancastrian, who was often in a skilled trade, or the armed services. The plots were geared to Formby trying to achieve success in a field unfamiliar to him (in horse racing, the TT Races, as a spy or a policeman), and by winning the affections of a middle-class girl in the process. Interspersed throughout each film is a series of songs by Formby, in which he plays the banjo, banjolele or ukulele. The films are, in the words of the film historian Brian McFarlane, "unpretentiously skilful in their balance between broad comedy and action, laced with ... [Formby's] shy ordinariness".

"To overcrowded flats I've been,
Sixteen in one bed I've seen,
With the lodger tucked up in between,
When I'm cleaning windows!

Now lots of girls I've had to jilt,
For they admire the way I'm built,
It's a good job I don't wear a kilt,
When I'm cleaning windows!"

— Banned by the BBC: "The Window Cleaner", second recorded version

No Limit was followed by Keep Your Seats, Please in 1936, which was again directed by Banks with Desmond returning as the co-star. Tensions arose in pre-production with Banks and some of the cast requesting to Dean that Beryl be banned from the set. Tempers had also become strained between Formby and Desmond, who were not on speaking terms except to film scenes. The situation became so bad that Dean avoided visiting his studios for the month of filming. The film contained the song "The Window Cleaner" (popularly known as "When I'm Cleaning Windows"), which was soon banned by the BBC. The corporation's director John Reith stated that "if the public wants to listen to Formby singing his disgusting little ditty, they'll have to be content to hear it in the cinemas, not over the nation's airwaves"; Formby and Beryl were furious with the block on the song. In May 1941 Beryl informed the BBC that the song was a favourite of the royal family, particularly Queen Mary, while a statement by Formby pointed out that "I sang it before the King and Queen at the Royal Variety Performance". The BBC relented and started to broadcast the song.

When production finished on Keep Your Seats, Please, Beryl insisted that for the next film there should be "no Eye-Ties [sic] and stuck-up little trollops involved", referring to Banks and Desmond, respectively. Dean had tired of the on-set squabbles, and for the third ATP film, Feather Your Nest, he appointed William Beaudine as the director, and Polly Ward, the niece of the music hall star Marie Lloyd, as the female lead. Bret describes the songs in the film as "comparatively bland", but "with the exception of the one which would become immortal": "Leaning on a Lamp-post". (Note: Fisher describes "Leaning on a Lamp-post" as being "the most perfect expression of [Formby's] charm, at once dignified, touching and humane". He compares it to "Standing at the Corner of the Street" by Formby's father, and writes that Formby's "subdued interpretation" of the song may be because of his father's earlier tune.)

By the time of the next production, Keep Fit in 1937, Dean had begun to assemble a special team at Ealing Studios to help develop and produce the Formby films; key among the members were the director Anthony Kimmins, who went on to direct five of Formby's films. Kay Walsh was cast as the leading lady and, in the absences of Beryl from the set, Formby and Walsh had an affair, after she fell for his "flirtatious behaviour off-camera". (Note: Beryl's absence from the film set was for medical reasons; she either fell from a horse, or was having her appendix removed.) Although Beryl was furious with Walsh, and tried to have her removed from the film, a showdown with Dean proved fruitless. Dean informed her that Walsh was to remain the lead in both Keep Fit, and in Formby's next film (I See Ice, 1938); to mollify her Dean raised Formby's fee for the latter film to £25,000. (Note: Formby's fee of £25,000 is approximately £1.44 million in 2014.)

When filming concluded on I See Ice, Formby spent the 1937 summer season performing in the revue King Cheer at the Opera House Theatre, Blackpool, before appearing in a 12-minute slot in the Royal Variety Performance at the London Palladium that November. The popularity of his performances meant that in 1937 he was the top British male star in box office takings, a position he held every subsequent year until 1943. Additionally, between 1938 and 1942 he was also the highest-paid entertainer in Britain, and by the end of the 1930s was earning £100,000 a year. (Note: Formby's annual earnings of £100,000 is approximately £5.25 million in 2014.) In early 1938 Dean informed the Formbys that in the next film, It's in the Air, Banks would return to direct and Walsh would again be the leading lady. Beryl objected strongly, and Kimmins continued his directorial duties, while Ward was brought in for the female lead. Beryl, as she did with all Formby's female co-stars, "read the 'keep-your-hands-off-my-husband' riot act" to the actress. In May, while filming It's in the Air, Formby purchased a Rolls-Royce, with the personalised number plate GF 1. Every year afterwards he would purchase either a new Rolls-Royce or Bentley, buying 26 over the course of his life.

In the autumn of 1938 Formby began work on Trouble Brewing, released the following year with 19-year-old Googie Withers as the female lead; Kimmins again directed. Withers later recounted that Formby did not speak to her until, during a break in filming when Beryl was not present, he whispered out of the corner of his mouth "I'm sorry, love, but you know, I'm not allowed to speak to you", something she thought was "very sweet". His second release of 1939—shortly after the outbreak of the Second World War—was Come On George!, which cast Pat Kirkwood in the female lead; the pair disliked each other intensely, and neither of the Formbys liked several of the other senior cast members. Come On George! was screened for troops serving in France before being released in Britain.

=== Second World War: service with ENSA ===
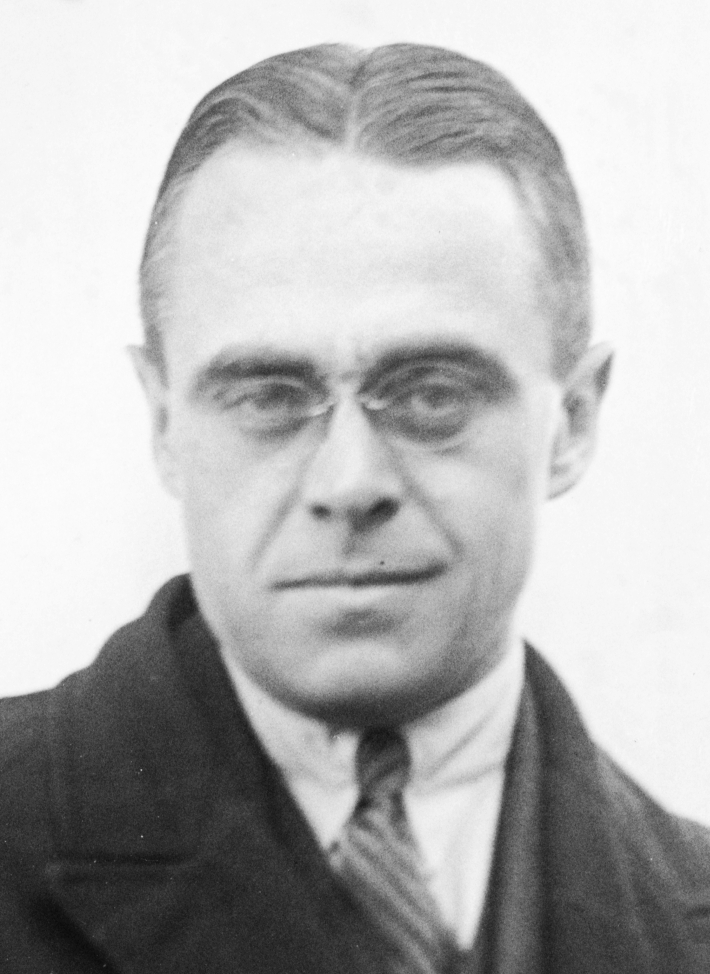
Basil Dean, who produced 11 of Formby's films between 1939 and 1941

At the outbreak of the Second World War Dean left ATP and became the head of the Entertainments National Service Association (ENSA), the organisation that provided entertainment to the British Armed Forces. (Note: ENSA had been formed in 1938, although the formation was actually a re-formation, as the organisation had been active during the First World War.) Over the course of five months Formby requested to sign up for ENSA, but was denied; Dean relented in February 1940, and Formby was signed on a fixed salary of £10 per week, although he still remained under contract to ATP. He undertook his first tour in France in March, where he performed for members of the British Expeditionary Force.

The social research organisation Mass-Observation recorded that Formby's first film of 1940, Let George Do It!, gave a particularly strong boost to early-war British civilian morale. In a dream sequence after being drugged, Formby's character ropes into a Nuremberg Rally and punches Hitler. According to Richards, the scene provided "the visual encapsulation of the people's war with the English Everyman flooring the Nazi Superman". The scene was so striking that the film became Formby's first international release, in the US, under the title To Hell With Hitler, and in Moscow—where it was released in 1943 under the title Dinky Doo—it was shown to packed houses and received record box-office takings for over ten months. The critics also praised the film, and the Kinematograph Weekly called it Formby's "best performance to date", and the film, "a box office certainty".

Formby's ENSA commitments were heavy, touring factories, theatres and concert halls around Britain. He also gave free concerts for charities and worthy causes, and raised £10,000 for the Fleetwood Fund on behalf of the families of missing trawlermen. He and Beryl also set up their own charities, such as the OK Club for Kids, whose aim was to provide cigarettes for Yorkshire soldiers, and the Jump Fund, to provide home-knitted balaclavas, scarves and socks to servicemen. Formby also joined the Home Guard as a dispatch rider, where he took his duties seriously, and fitted them around his other work whenever he could.

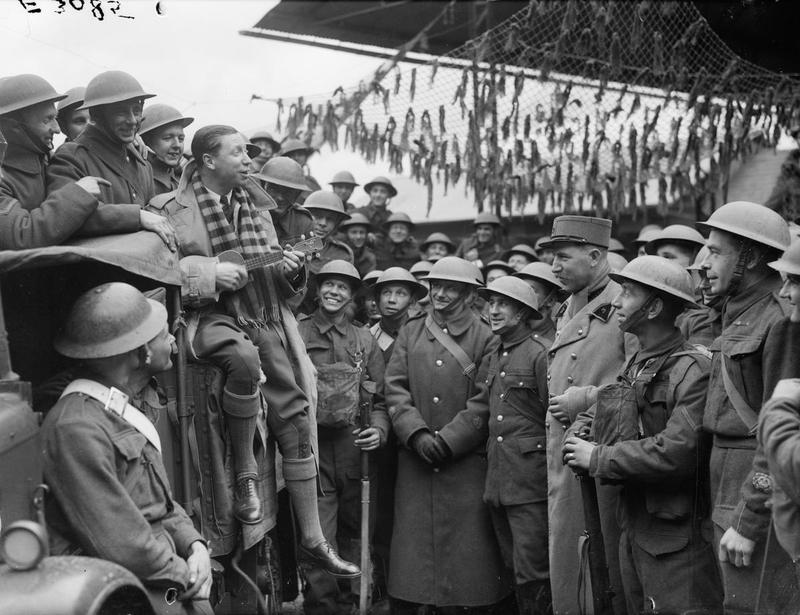
Formby entertains soldiers from the British Expeditionary Force in France on 13 March 1940

Formby continued filming with ATP, and his second film of 1940, Spare a Copper, was again focused on an aspect of the war, this time combating fifth columnists and saboteurs in a Merseyside dockyard. Cinema-goers had begun to tire of war films, and his next venture, Turned Out Nice Again returned to less contentious issues, with Formby's character caught in a domestic battle between his new wife and mother. Early in the filming schedule, he took time to perform in an ENSA show that was broadcast on the BBC from Aldwych tube station as Let the People Sing; he sang four songs, and told the audience, "Don't forget, it's wonderful to be British!" Towards the end of 1940 Formby tried to enlist for active military service, despite Beryl informing him that by being a member of ENSA he was already signed up. The examining board rejected him as being unfit, because he had sinusitis and arthritic toes. He spent the winter season in pantomime at the Opera House Theatre, Blackpool, portraying Idle Jack in Dick Whittington. When the season came to an end the Formbys moved to London and, in May 1941, performed for the royal family at Windsor Castle. He had commissioned a new set of inoffensive lyrics for "When I'm Cleaning Windows", but was informed that he should sing the original, uncensored version, which was enjoyed by the royal party, particularly Queen Mary, who asked for a repeat of the song. King George VI presented Formby with a set of gold cuff links, and advised him to "wear them, not put them away".

With the ATP contract at an end, Formby decided not to renew or push for an extension. Robert Murphy, in his study of wartime British cinema, points out that Balcon, Formby's producer at the time, "seems to have made little effort to persuade him not to transfer his allegiance", despite the box office success enjoyed by Let George Do It and Spare a Copper. Numerous offers came in, and Formby selected the American company Columbia Pictures, in a deal worth in excess of £500,000 (Note: The contract with Columbia of £500,000 is equivalent to approximately £21 million in 2014.) to make a minimum of six films—seven were eventually made. Formby set up his own company, Hillcrest Productions, to distribute the films, and had the final decision on the choice of director, scriptwriter and theme, while Columbia would have the choice of leading lady. Part of Formby's reasoning behind the decision was a desire for parts with more character, something that would not have happened at ATP.

At the end of August 1941 production began on Formby's first film for Columbia, South American George, which took six weeks to complete. Formby's move to an American company was controversial, and although his popular appeal seemed unaffected, his "films were treated with increasing critical hostility", according to John Mundy in his 2007 examination of British musical film. The reviewer for The Times wrote that the story was "confused" and considered that "there is not sufficient comic invention in the telling" of it. Murphy writes that the criticism "had more to do with the inadequate vehicles which he subsequently appeared in than in any diminution of his personal popularity".

"Standing with his back to a tree or a wall of sandbags, with men squatting on the ground in front of him, he sang song after song, screwing up his face into comical expressions of fright whenever shells exploded in the near distance, and making little cracks when the firing drowned the point lines in his songs".

— Basil Dean, the head of ENSA, on some of Formby's work with the organisation.

In early 1942 Formby undertook a three-week, 72-show tour of Northern Ireland, largely playing to troops but also undertaking fund-raising shows for charity—one at the Belfast Hippodrome raised £500. He described his time in Ulster as "the pleasantest tour I've ever undertaken". He returned to the mainland by way of the Isle of Man, where he entertained the troops guarding the internment camps. After further charity shows—raising £8,000 for a tank fund—Formby was the associate producer for the Vera Lynn film We'll Meet Again (1943). In March he also filmed Much Too Shy which was released in October that year. Although the film was poorly received by the critics, the public still attended in large numbers, and the film was profitable.

In the summer of 1942 Formby was involved in a controversy with the Lord's Day Observance Society, who had filed law suits against the BBC for playing secular music on Sunday. The society began a campaign against the entertainment industry, claiming all theatrical activity on a Sunday was unethical, and cited a 1667 law which made it illegal. With 60 leading entertainers already avoiding Sunday working, Dean informed Formby that his stance would be crucial in avoiding a spread of the problem. Formby issued a statement, "I'll hang up my uke on Sundays only when our lads stop fighting and getting killed on Sundays ... as far as the Lord's Day Observance Society are concerned, they can mind their own bloody business. And in any case, what have they done for the war effort except get on everyone's nerves?" The following day it was announced that the pressure from the society was to be lifted.

At the end of the year Formby started filming Get Cracking, a story about the Home Guard, which was completed in under a month, the tight schedule brought about by an impending ENSA tour of the Mediterranean. (Note: While on leave from the Irish Guards, Harry Parr-Davies was given just ten days to complete the music for the film before returning to service.) Between the end of filming Get Cracking and the release of the film in May 1943, Formby undertook a tour of Northern Scotland and the Orkney Islands, and had nearly completed shooting on his next film, Bell-Bottom George. The reviewer for The Times opined that "Get Cracking, although a distinct improvement on other films in which Mr Formby has appeared, is cut too closely to fit the demands of an individual technique to achieve any real life of its own".

Bell-Bottom George was described 60 years later by the academic Baz Kershaw as being "unashamedly gay and ... peppered with homoerotic scenes"; Bret concurs, and notes that "the majority of the cast and almost every one of the male extras was unashamedly gay", (Note: Beryl called one group of supporting actors "The Five Queens": Charles Farrell, Reginald Purdell, Peter Murray-Hill, Charles Hawtrey and Manning Whiley.) The film was a hit with what Bret describes as Formby's "surprisingly large, closeted gay following". The reviewer for The Manchester Guardian was impressed with the film, and wrote that "there is a new neatness of execution and lightness of touch about this production ... while George himself can no longer be accused of trailing clouds of vaudevillian glory". The reviewer also considered Formby "our first authentic and strictly indigenous film comedian". After completing filming, the Formbys undertook a further ENSA tour. Although Dean personally disliked the Formbys, he greatly admired the tireless work they did for the organisation. In August Formby undertook a 53-day tour in a significant portion of the Mediterranean, including Italy, Sicily, Malta, Gibraltar, Libya, Tunisia, Egypt, Lebanon and Palestine; (Note: Further visits to Syria and Turkey were cancelled after the couple contracted malaria.) visiting 750,000 troops in thirteen countries, touring 25,000 miles (40,000 km) in the process and returning to England in October. The couple travelled around the countryside in a Ford Mercury that Formby had purchased from the racing driver Sir Malcolm Campbell, which had been converted to sleep two in the back.

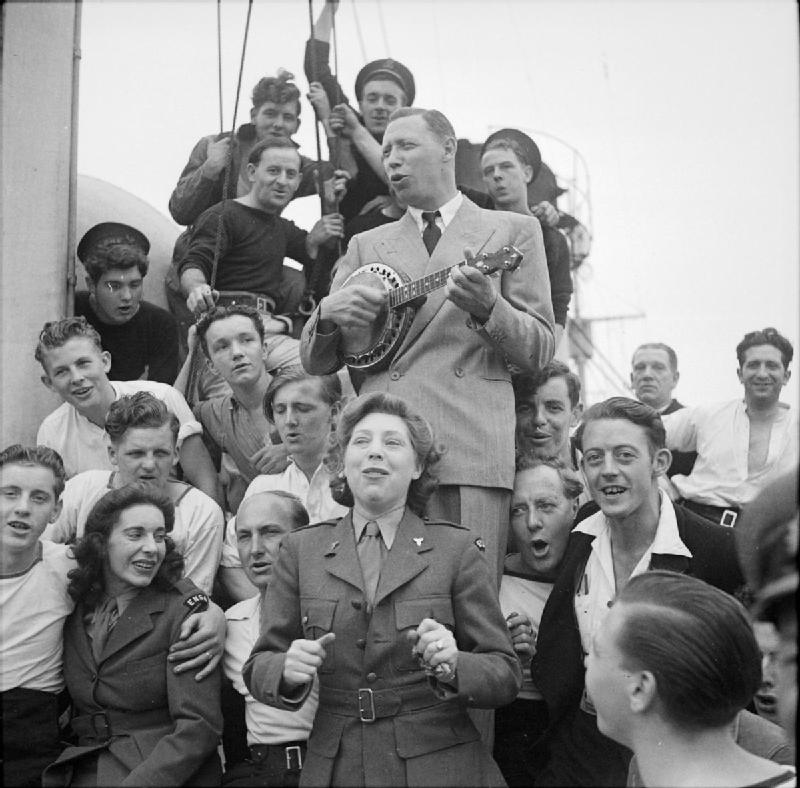
Formby and his wife on HMS Ambitious, off the Normandy coast in 1944

In January 1944 Formby described his experiences touring for ENSA in Europe and the Middle East in a BBC radio broadcast. He said that the troops "were worrying quite a lot about you folks at home, but we soon put them right about that. We told them that after four and a half years, Britain was still the best country to live in". Shortly after he began filming He Snoops to Conquer—his fifth picture for Columbia—he was visited on set by the Dance Music Policy Committee (DMPC), an organisation responsible for vetting music for broadcast, which had also been given responsibility for checking if music was sympathetic towards the enemy during the war. The DMPC interviewed Formby about three songs that had been included in Bell-Bottom George: "Swim Little Fish", "If I Had a Girl Like You" and "Bell-Bottom George". Formby was summoned to the BBC's offices to perform his three songs in front of the committee, with his song checked against the available sheet music. A week later, on 1 February, the committee met and decided the songs were innocuous, although Formby was told that he would have to get further clearance if the lyrics were changed. Bret opines that he had been the victim of a plot by a member of the Variety Artists' Federation, following Formby's scathing comments on entertainers who were too scared to leave London to entertain the troops. The comments, which appeared in the forces magazine Union Jack, were then widely reported in the press in Britain. The Variety Artists' Federation demanded that Formby release names, and threatened him with action if he did not do so, but he refused to give in to their pressure.

Formby went to Normandy in July 1944 in the vanguard of a wave of ENSA performers. He and Beryl travelled over on a rough crossing to Arromanches giving a series of impromptu concerts to troops in improvised conditions, including on the backs of farm carts and army lorries, or in bomb-cratered fields. In one location the German front line was too close for him to perform, so he crawled into the trenches and told jokes with the troops there. (Note: Formby had been told that the sound of his playing would have given away the position.) He then boarded HMS Ambitious for his first scheduled concert before returning to France to continue his tour. During dinner with General Bernard Montgomery, whom he had met in North Africa, Formby was invited to visit the glider crews of 6th Airborne Division, who had been holding a series of bridges without relief for 56 days. He did so on 17 August in a one-day visit to the front line bridges, where he gave nine shows, all standing beside a sandbag wall, ready to jump into a slit trench in case of problems; much of the time his audience were in foxholes. After the four-week tour of France, Formby returned home to start work on I Didn't Do It (released in 1945), although he continued to work on ENSA concerts and tours in Britain. Between January and March 1945, shortly after the release of He Snoops to Conquer, he left on an ENSA tour that took in Burma, India and Ceylon (now Sri Lanka). The concerts in the Far East were his last for ENSA, and by the end of the war it was estimated that he had performed in front of three million service personnel.

=== Post-war career: 1946–1952 ===
In 1946 the song "With My Little Stick of Blackpool Rock", which Formby had recorded in 1937, began to cause problems at the BBC for broadcasts of Formby or his music. The producer of one of Formby's live television programmes received a letter from a BBC manager that stated "We have no record that "With My Little Stick of Blackpool Rock" is banned. We do however know and so does Formby, that certain lines in the lyric must not be broadcast". Other sources, including the BBC, state that the song was banned from being broadcast. Between July and October 1946 Formby filmed George in Civvy Street, which would be his final film. The story concerns the rivalry between two pubs: the Unicorn, bequeathed to Formby's character, and the Lion, owned by his childhood sweetheart—played by Rosalyn Boulter—but run by an unscrupulous manager. Richards considers the film to have "symbolic significance"; at the end, with the marriage between the two pub owners, Formby "bowed out of films unifying the nation mythically, communally and matrimonially".

"With my little stick of Blackpool rock
Along the promenade I stroll;
In my pocket it got stuck I could tell,
'Cos when I pulled it out I pulled my shirt up as well.
Every day, wherever I stray, the kids around me flock;
A girl while bathing clung to me—my wits I had to use—
She cried I'm drowning and to save me you won't refuse;
I said well if you're drowning I don't want to lose
My little stick of Blackpool rock"

— "With My Little Stick of Blackpool Rock":
banned by the BBC?

The film was less successful at the box office than his previous works, as audience tastes had changed in the post-war world. Fisher opines that because of his tireless war work, Formby had become too synonymous with the war, causing the public to turn away from him, much as they had from the wartime British Prime Minister, Winston Churchill. Bret believes that post-war audiences wanted intrigue, suspense and romance, through the films of James Mason, Stewart Granger, David Niven and Laurence Olivier. Bret also indicates that Formby's cinematic decline was shared by similar performers, including Gracie Fields, Tommy Trinder and Will Hay. Formby's biographers, Alan Randall and Ray Seaton, opine that in his late 40s, Formby "was greying and thickening out", and was too old to play the innocent young Lancashire lad. The slump in his screen popularity hit Formby hard, and he became depressed. In early 1946 Beryl checked him into a psychiatric hospital under her maiden name, Ingham. He came out after five weeks, in time for a tour of Scandinavia in May.

On his return from Scandinavia Formby went into pantomime in Blackpool; while there, he learned of his appointment as Officer of the Order of the British Empire (OBE) in the 1946 King's Birthday Honours. Although delighted, he was upset that Beryl went without official recognition, and said "if somethin' was comin' our way, ah'd like it to be somethin' Beryl could have shared". Later that year the Formbys toured South Africa shortly before formal racial apartheid was introduced. While there they refused to play racially-segregated venues. When Formby was cheered by a black audience after embracing a small black girl who had presented his wife with a box of chocolates, National Party leader Daniel François Malan (who later introduced apartheid) telephoned to complain; Beryl replied "Why don't you piss off, you horrible little man?"

Formby returned to Britain at Christmas and appeared in Dick Whittington at the Grand Theatre, Leeds for nine weeks, and then, in February 1947, he appeared in variety for two weeks at the London Palladium. Reviewing the show, The Times thought Formby was "more than ever the mechanized perfection of naive jollity. His smile, though fixed, is winning, and his songs ... are catchy". In September that year he went on a 12-week tour of Australia and New Zealand. On his return he was offered more film roles, but turned them down, saying "when I look back on some of the films I've done in the past it makes me want to cringe. I'm afraid the days of being a clown are gone. From now on I'm only going to do variety". He began suffering increasing health problems including a gastric ulcer, and was treated for breathing problems from his heavy smoking. He finished the year in pantomime, appearing as Buttons in Cinderella at the Liverpool Empire Theatre, with Beryl playing Dandini.

In September 1949 Formby went on a 19 city coast-to-coast Canadian tour, from which he returned unwell. While subsequently appearing in Cinderella in Leeds, he collapsed in his dressing room. The attending doctor administered morphine, to which Formby briefly became addicted. Further poor health plagued him into 1950, with a bout of dysentery, followed by appendicitis, (Note: Formby also suffered from depression that year.) after which he recuperated in Norfolk, before giving another royal command performance that April. He undertook two further international tours that year: one to Scandinavia, and a second to Canada. His earnings of Ca$200,000 were heavily taxed: Canadian taxes took up $68,000, and UK taxes took 90% of the balance. Formby complained to reporters about the level of taxation, saying "That's it. So long as the government keeps bleeding me dry, I shan't be in much of a hurry to work again!"; he and Beryl spent the rest of the year resting in Norfolk, in temporary retirement.

Formby was tempted back to work by the theatrical impresario Emile Littler, who offered him the lead role of Percy Piggott in Zip Goes a Million, a play based on the 1902 novel Brewster's Millions by G. B. McCutcheon; Formby was offered £1,500, plus a share of the box-office takings. The show premiered at the Coventry Hippodrome in September 1951 before opening at the Palace Theatre, London on 20 October. The Times commented unfavourably, saying that although the audience were appreciative of the play, they "could not conceivably have detected a spark of wit in either the lyrics or the dialogue"; the paper was equally dismissive of Formby, writing that "he has a deft way with a song or a banjo, but little or no finesse in his handling of a comic situation".

A month after the play opened in London, Formby was the guest star on Desert Island Discs, where one of his choices was his father's "Standing on the Corner of the Street". (Note: His selection was: Bing Crosby, "McNamara's Band": Josef Locke, "Hear My Song, Violetta"; Vera Lynn, "Be Like the Kettle and Sing"; Tennessee Ernie Ford, "The Shot Gun Boogie"; Philharmonia Orchestra, "Londonderry Air"; John McCormack, "The Kerry Dance"; Phil Harris and His Orchestra, "Never Trust a Woman"; George Formby Sr, "Standing on the Corner of the Street"; his luxury item was his first ukulele.) In early 1952 Formby's health began to decline and, on 28 April, he decided to withdraw from Zip Goes a Million. On the way to the theatre to inform Littler, Formby suffered a heart attack, although it took the doctors five days to diagnose the coronary and admit him to hospital. He was treated for both the attack, and his morphine addiction. He stayed in hospital for nine weeks before returning home to Lytham St Annes, Lancashire, where he announced his retirement.

=== Health problems and intermittent work: 1952–1960 ===
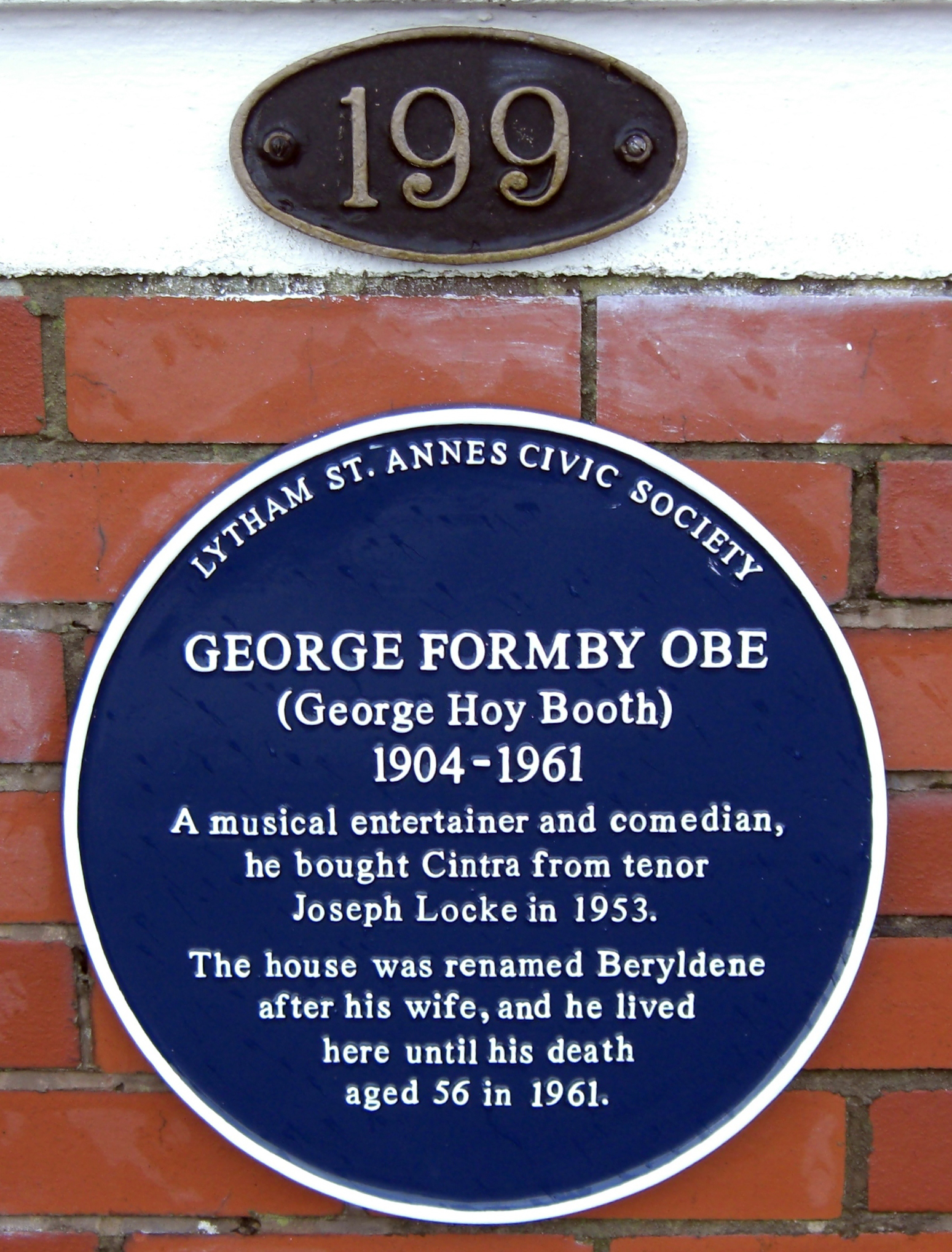
Blue plaque at Formby's house Beryldene, Inner Promenade, Lytham St Annes, Lancashire

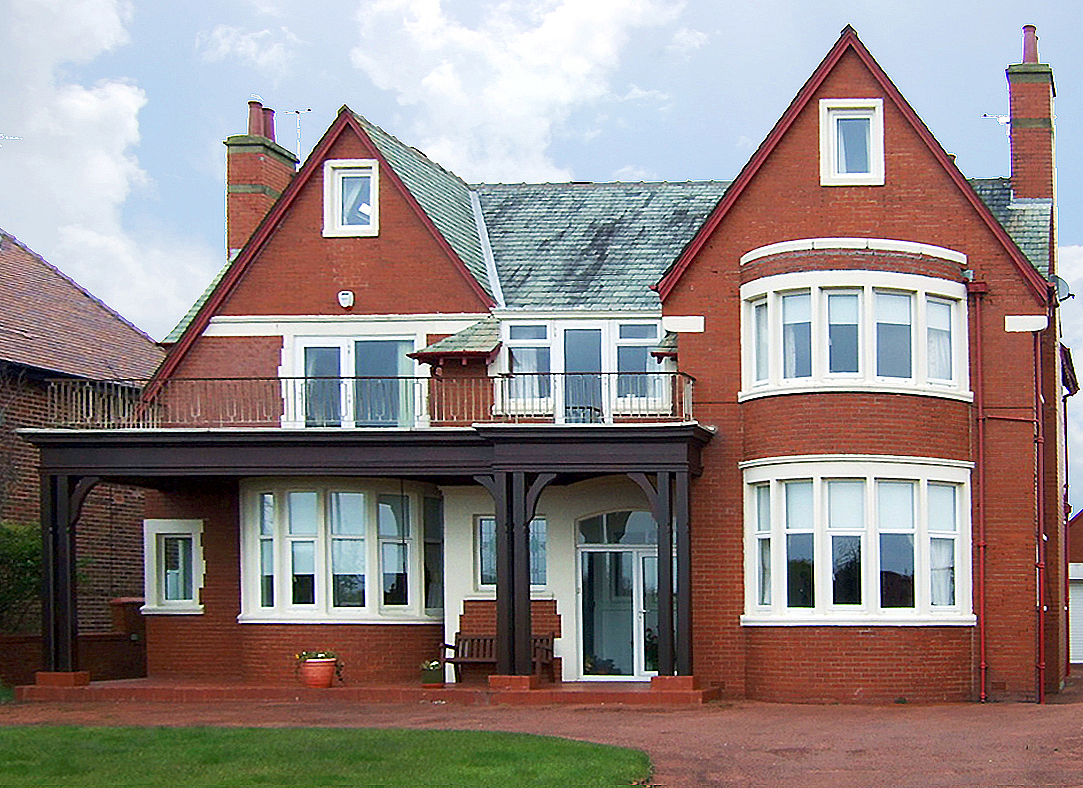
Formby's house, Lytham St Anne's

During his recuperation Formby contracted gastroenteritis and had a suspected blood clot on his lung, after which he underwent an operation to clear a fishbone that was stuck in his throat. He had recovered sufficiently by April 1953 to undertake a 17-show tour of Southern Rhodesia (now Zimbabwe), before a special appearance at the Garrick Theatre, Southport. That September he turned on the Blackpool Illuminations.

From October to December 1953 Formby appeared at the London Palladium in 138 performances of the revue Fun and the Fair, with Terry-Thomas and the Billy Cotton band; Formby appeared in the penultimate act of the evening, with Terry-Thomas closing the show. Although Formby's act was well-received, the show was not as successful as had been hoped, and Terry-Thomas later wrote that "Formby put the audience in a certain mood which made them non-receptive to whoever followed ... Even though my act was the star spot, I felt on this occasion that my being there was an anti-climax". He requested that the order be changed to have Formby close the show, but this was turned down. Formby suffered from stage fright during the show's run—the first time he had suffered from the condition since his earliest days on stage—and his bouts of depression returned, along with stomach problems.

Formby took a break from work until mid-1954, when he starred in the revue Turned Out Nice Again, in Blackpool. Although the show was initially scheduled to run for 13 weeks, it was cut short after six when Formby suffered again from dysentery and depression. He again announced his retirement, but continued to work. After some television appearances on Ask Pickles and Top of the Town, in late 1954 and early 1955 respectively, Formby travelled to South Africa for a tour, where Beryl negotiated an agreement with the South African premier Johannes Strijdom to play in venues of Formby's choice, and then sailed to Canada for a ten-day series of performances. On the return voyage he contracted bronchial pneumonia, but still joined the cast of the non-musical play Too Young to Marry on his arrival in Britain.

In August 1955 Beryl felt unwell and went for tests: she was diagnosed with cancer of the uterus and was given two years to live. The couple reacted to the news in different ways, and while Beryl began to drink heavily—up to a bottle of whisky a day to dull the pain—George began to work harder, and began a close friendship with a school teacher, Pat Howson. (Note: Bret goes as far as to call Formby and Howson "soul-mates", although he points out that "just how far their relationship progressed beyond the platonic is not known".)

Too Young to Marry toured between September 1955 and November 1956, but still allowed Formby time to appear in the Christmas pantomime Babes in the Wood at the Liverpool Empire Theatre. The touring production was well received everywhere except in Scotland, where Formby's attempted Scottish accent is thought to have put people off. For Christmas 1956 he appeared in his first London pantomime, playing Idle Jack in Dick Whittington and His Cat at the Palace Theatre, although he withdrew from the run in early February after suffering from laryngitis. According to Bret, Formby spent the remainder of 1957 "doing virtually nothing", although he appeared in two television programmes, Val Parnell's Saturday Spectacular in July and Top of the Bill in October.

From March 1958 Formby appeared in the musical comedy Beside the Seaside, a Holiday Romp in Hull, Blackpool, Birmingham and Brighton. By the time it reached Brighton the play was playing to increasingly small audiences, and the run was cut short as a result. The play may not have been to southern audiences' tastes—the plot centres on a northern family's holiday in Blackpool—and the Brighton audiences may have been too small, but those in the north, particularly Blackpool, thought highly of it and the show was a nightly sell-out. When the show closed Formby was disappointed and vowed never to appear in another stage musical. Later that year he made one-off appearances in three television shows. (Note: Formby appeared on The Frankie Vaughan Show in January, Many Happy Returns, in February and presenting George Formby Presents: Formby Favourites in September.) He began 1959 by appearing in Val Parnell's Spectacular: The Atlantic Showboat in January, and in April hosted his own show, Steppin' Out With Formby. During the summer season he appeared at the Windmill Theatre, Great Yarmouth, although he missed two weeks of performances when he was involved in a car crash on the August Bank Holiday. When doctors examined him, they were concerned with his overall health, partly as a result of his forty cigarettes-a-day smoking habit. He also had high blood pressure, was overweight and had heart problems.

Formby's final year of work was 1960. That May he recorded his last session of songs, "Happy Go Lucky Me" and "Banjo Boy", the former of which peaked at number 40 in the UK Singles Chart. He then spent the summer season at the Queen's Theatre in Blackpool in The Time of Your Life—a performance which was also broadcast by the BBC. One of the acts in the show was the singer Yana, with whom Formby had an affair, made easier because of Beryl's absence from the theatre through illness. (Note: Yana was the stage name of Pamela Guard, the lead female singer of the show.) His final televised performance, a 35-minute BBC programme, The Friday Show: George Formby, was aired on 16 December. Bret considers the programme to be Formby's "greatest performance—it was certainly his most sincere", although reviewing for The Guardian, Mary Crozier thought it "too slow". She went on to say "George Formby is really a music-hall star, and it needs the warmth and sociability of the theatre to bring out his full appeal". Beryl's illness was worsening. Worn down by the strain, and feeling the need to escape, Formby took the part of Mr Wu in Aladdin in Bristol, having turned down a more lucrative part in Blackpool.

=== Final months: a new romance, death and family dispute ===
Two hours before the premiere of Aladdin—on Christmas Eve 1960—Formby received a phone call from Beryl's doctor, saying that she was in a coma and was not expected to survive the night; Formby went through with the performance, and was told early the next morning that Beryl had died. Her cremation took place on 27 December, and an hour after the service Formby returned to Bristol to appear in that day's matinee performance of Aladdin. He continued in the show until 14 January when a cold forced him to rest, on doctors' advice. He returned to Lytham St Annes and communicated with Pat Howson; she contacted his doctor and Formby was instructed to go to hospital, where he remained for the next two weeks.

On Valentine's Day 1961, seven weeks after Beryl's death, Formby and Howson announced their engagement. Eight days later he suffered a heart attack which was so severe that he was given the last rites of the Catholic Church on his arrival at hospital in Preston. He was revived and, from his hospital bed, he and Howson planned their wedding, which was due to take place in May. He was still there when, on 6 March, he had a further heart attack and died at the age of 56. The obituarist for The Times wrote that "he was the amateur of the old smoking concert platform turned into a music-hall professional of genius", while Donald Zec, writing in the Daily Mirror, called him "as great an entertainer as any of the giants of the music-hall". The Guardian considered that "with his ukulele, his songs, and his grinning patter, the sum was greater than any of those parts: a Lancashire character", while in the eyes of the public, Formby's "passing was genuinely and widely mourned".

Formby was buried alongside his father in Warrington Cemetery with over 150,000 mourners lining the route. (Note: Sources vary, with estimates from The Guardian and The Independent of 100,000.) The undertaker was Bruce Williams who, as Eddie Latta, had written songs for Formby. An hour after the ceremony the family read the will, which had been drawn up two weeks previously. Harry Scott—Formby's valet and factotum—was to receive £5,000, while the rest was to go to Howson; at probate Formby's estate was valued at £135,000. (Note: Formby's estate of £135,000 is approximately £2.54 million in 2014.) Formby's mother and siblings were angered by the will, and contested it. In the words of Bret "mourning ... [Formby] was marred by a greedy family squabbling over his not inconsiderable fortune".

Because the will was contested, Formby's solicitor insisted that a public auction was held for the contents of Formby's house, which took place over three days in June. Howson offered to honour an earlier will by providing £5,000 for Eliza and £2,000 each for Formby's sisters, but the offer was rejected, and the matter went to the High Court in London. The case was heard in May 1963 before Mr Justice Ormrod. At the end, Eliza was granted £5,000, and the sisters received £2,000 each. Formby's solicitor, John Crowther, acted for Howson, and explained that the bequest to Formby's sisters from the older will was made "with reluctance" by Formby, who had described his family as "a set of scroungers". The family appealed the decision and the matter lasted until September 1965, when it was finally dismissed in Howson's favour.

== Screen persona and technique ==
"I'm just a clown without the make-up, the circus clown who magnifies the reactions of ordinary people to the things that happen around them".

— Formby on his stage persona.

Richards considers that Formby "had been able to embody simultaneously Lancashire, the working classes, the people, and the nation"; Geoff King, in his examination of film comedy, also sees Formby as an icon, and writes that "[Gracie] Fields and Formby gained the status of national as well as regional figures, without sacrificing their distinctive regional personality traits". While the national aspect was important for success outside the north, "the Lancashire accent remained to enhance his homely comic appeal". McFarlane writes that, on film, Formby portrayed "essentially gormless incompetents, aspiring to various kinds of professional success ... and even more improbably to a middle-class girlfriend, usually in the clutches of some caddish type with a moustache. Invariably he scored on both counts".

On an edition of ITV's The South Bank Show in November 1992, Richards commented that Formby "embodied qualities that people admired and found reassuring in the depression ... and you thought that here's a man whom whatever is thrown at him, will come through and come out smiling—and people wanted that". H.J. Igoe, writing in The Catholic Herald, thinks that "Formby has a common English touch. We warm to the kindly turnip face, the revolving eyes, the mouth like a slashed coconut, the silly little songs ... the melodiously tinny voice and twanging banjo. The comedian is the universal works—platoon and bar-room simpleton—mother's boy—the beloved henpeck—the father who cannot hang a picture and underlying his everyday folly there is the sublime wisdom of the ordinary fool who loves and trusts the world. His comedy is earthy, but never lascivious".

"You know, some of the songs are a bit near. But they'll take them from me in evening dress; they wouldn't take them if I wore baggy pants and rednose".

— Formby on his suggestive lyrics.

Richards identifies in Formby "an innocence that was essentially childlike ... which explains why George was as popular with children as he was with adults"; Igoe agrees, and writes that "we know he loves children, because himself he is a child". Formby's screen and stage persona of innocence and simplicity was not seen as ignorance or stupidity, although Basil Dean disagreed and thought that Formby "didn't act gormless as many successful Lancashire comedians have done, he was gormless". Much of the innocence in Formby's performance is connected to sex, and the use of double entendres within his songs. John Caughie and Kevin Rockett, in their examination of British film, and Richards, see a connection between Formby's approach to sex and the saucy seaside postcards of Donald McGill. Richards sees the function of Formby's humour as being the same as McGill's: "the harmless diffusion of a major source of tension in a deeply repressed and conventional society". Formby's delivery of the sexual content—what McFarlane identifies as being "sung with such a toothy grin and air of innocence"—negated any possible indignation, and this contrasts with the more overtly sexual delivery of other performers of the time, such as Max Miller and Frank Randle.

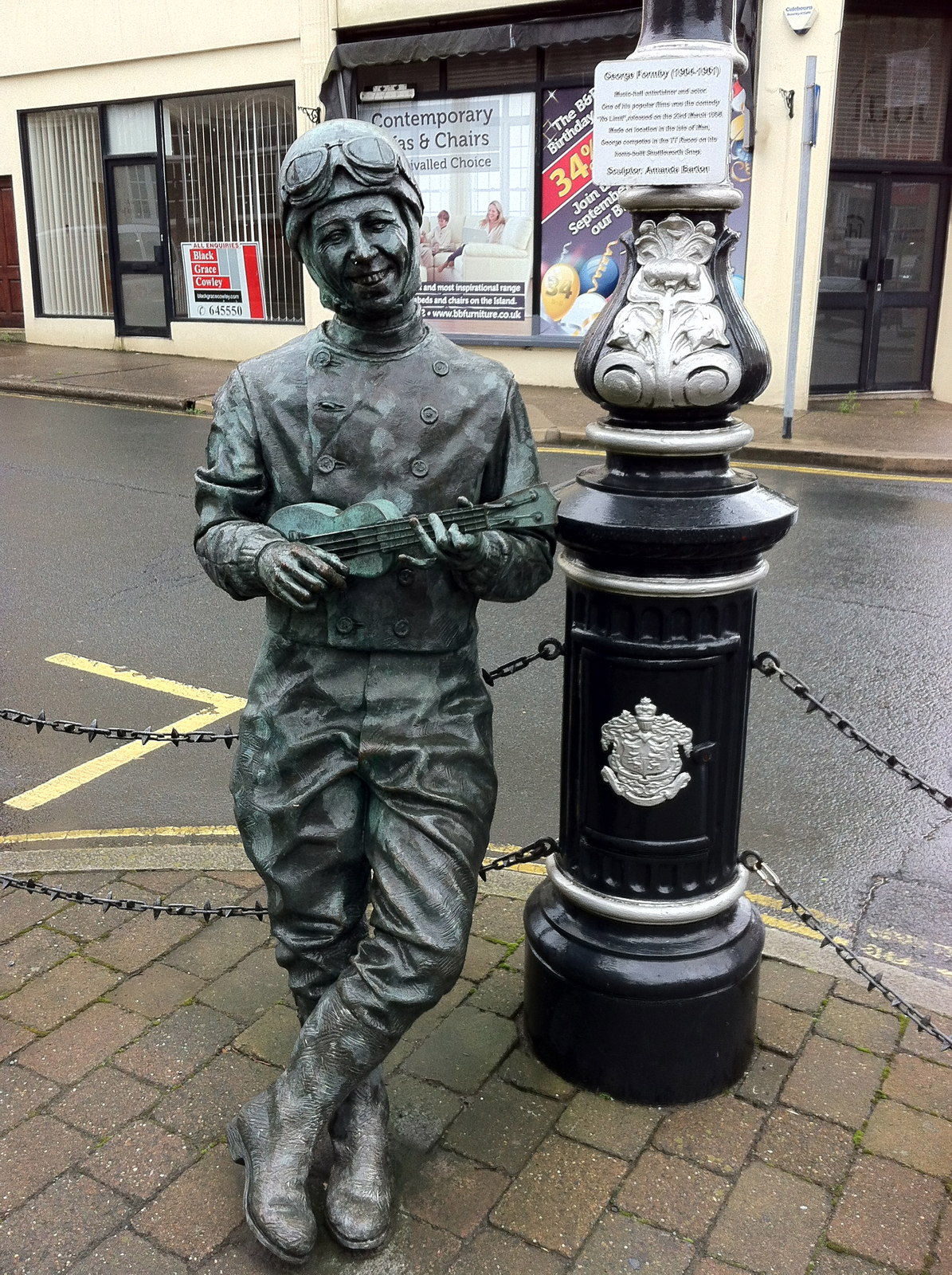
The statue of Formby in Douglas, Isle of Man

The ukulele expert Steven Sproat considers that Formby "was incredible ... There hasn't really been a uke player since Formby—or even before Formby—who played quite like him". Much of Formby's virtuosity came from his right-hand technique, the split stroke, and he developed his own fast and complicated syncopated musical style with a very fast right-hand strum. Joe Cooper, writing in New Society, considered that "Nobody has ever reproduced the casual devastating right hand syncopation, which so delicately synchronised with deft left hand chord fingering".

== Legacy ==
Shortly after Formby's death a small group of fans formed the George Formby Society, which had its inaugural meeting at the Imperial Hotel Blackpool. George Harrison was a fan of Formby, a member of the Society and an advocate of the ukulele. The rest of the Beatles were also fans—they improvised with ukuleles during the recording breaks on Let It Be—and Formby's influence can be heard in the song "Her Majesty". The Beatles' 1995 single "Free as a Bird", ends with a coda including a strummed ukulele by Harrison and the voice of John Lennon played backwards, saying "Turned out nice again".

Formby's screen persona influenced Norman Wisdom in the 1950s and Charlie Drake in the following decade. A statue of Formby by the Manx artist Amanda Barton in Douglas, Isle of Man, shows him leaning on a lamp-post and dressed in the motorcycle leathers of a TT racer. Barton also provided a second statue for the Lancashire town of Wigan, unveiled in September 2007 in the town's Grand Arcade shopping centre.

In the late 1960s Harry Scott published his reminiscences of Formby, The Fabulous Formby, in 14 issues of The Vellum, the magazine of the George Formby Society; (Note: Bret considers Scott's writing to be a "stylised ... overbearingly sycophantic account".) John Fisher published George Formby in 1975 before Alan Randall and Ray Seaton published their book in 1974 and David Bret produced George Formby: A Troubled Genius in 1999. Sue Smart and Richard Bothway Howard published another biography in 2011, It's Turned Out Nice Again!. Documentaries about Formby on British television have included an edition of The South Bank Show in 1992 and Frank Skinner on George Formby in 2011.

In 2004 Formby was inducted into the Ukulele Hall of Fame, a non-profit organisation for the preservation of ukulele history. His citation reads, in part: "He won such love and respect for his charismatic stage presence, technical skill and playful lyrics that he remains popular forty years after his death." In June 2012 a Blackpool Boat Car tram, number 604, was repainted and returned to service with sponsorship from the George Formby Society. The tram was named "George Formby OBE" and images of him are affixed within the trolley.

== Notes and references ==
=== Sources ===
- Aldgate, Anthony; Richards, Jeffrey (1994). Britain Can Take It: The British Cinema in the Second World War. Edinburgh: Edinburgh University Press. ISBN 978-0-7486-0508-8.
- Baade, Christina L. (2012). Victory Through Harmony: The BBC and Popular Music in World War II. Oxford: Oxford University Press. ISBN 978-0-19-537201-4.
- Banham, Martin (1995). The Cambridge Guide to Theatre. Cambridge: Cambridge University Press. ISBN 978-0-521-43437-9.
- Bret, David (1999). George Formby: A Troubled Genius. London: Robson Books. ISBN 978-1-86105-239-1.
- Burton, Alan; O'Sullivan, Tim (2009). The Cinema of Basil Dearden and Michael Relph. Edinburgh: Edinburgh University Press. ISBN 978-0-7486-3289-3.
- Caughie, John; Rockett, Kevin (1996). The Companion to British and Irish Cinema. London: Cassell. ISBN 978-0-304-34158-0.
- Fisher, John (1975). George Formby. London: Woburn-Futura. ISBN 978-0-7130-0139-6.
- Hayes, Nicky; Hill, Jeff (1999). 'Millions Like Us'?: British Culture in the Second World War. Liverpool: Liverpool University Press. ISBN 978-0-85323-763-1.
- Kershaw, Baz (2007). Theatre Ecology: Environments and Performance Events. Cambridge: Cambridge University Press. ISBN 978-0-521-87716-9.
- King, Geoff (2002). Film Comedy. London: Wallflower Press. ISBN 978-1-903364-35-2.
- Leng, Simon (2003). While My Guitar Gently Weeps: The Music of George Harrison. New York: Hal Leonard Corporation. ISBN 978-1-4234-0609-9.
- MacFarlane, Thomas (2007). The Beatles' Abbey Road Medley: Extended Forms in Popular Music. Lanham, MA: Scarecrow Press. ISBN 978-1-4617-3659-2.
- Magee, Sean (2012). Desert Island Discs: 70 Years of Castaways. London: Random House. ISBN 978-0-593-07006-2.
- McCann, Graham (2009). Bounder! The Biography of Terry-Thomas. London: Aurum Press. ISBN 978-1-84513-441-9.
- Mundy, John (2007). The British Musical Film. Manchester: Manchester University Press. ISBN 978-0-7190-6321-3.
- Murphy, Robert (1989). Realism and Tinsel: Cinema and Society in Britain, 1939–1948. London: Routledge. ISBN 978-0-415-02982-7.
- Murphy, Robert (2000). British Cinema and the Second World War. London: Continuum. ISBN 978-0-8264-5139-2.
- Pretor-Pinney, Gavin; Hodgkinson, Tom (2013). The Ukulele Handbook. London: A&C Black. ISBN 978-1-4088-3629-3.
- Randall, Alan; Seaton, Ray (1974). George Formby. London: W. H. Allen. ISBN 978-0-491-01771-8.
- Richards, Jeffrey (1997). Films and British National Identity: From Dickens to Dad's Army. Manchester: Manchester University Press. ISBN 978-0-7190-4742-8.
- Richards, Jeffrey (2004). "Formby, George [real name George Hoy Booth]". Oxford Dictionary of National Biography (online ed.). Oxford University Press. doi:10.1093/ref:odnb/33205. (Subscription, Wikipedia Library access or UK public library membership required.)
- Richards, Jeffrey (2010). The Age of the Dream Palace: Cinema and Society in 1930s Britain. London: I.B. Tauris. ISBN 978-1-84885-122-1.
- Roach, Martin (2008). The Virgin Book of British Hit Singles. London: Virgin Books. ISBN 978-0-7535-1537-2.
- Roose-Evans, James (2004). "Dean, Basil Herbert". Oxford Dictionary of National Biography (online ed.). Oxford University Press. doi:10.1093/ref:odnb/31016. (Subscription, Wikipedia Library access or UK public library membership required.)
- Ross, Robert (2002). The Complete Terry-Thomas. London: Reynolds & Hearn. ISBN 978-1-903111-29-1.
- Ryan, Brendan (1986). George Formby: A Catalogue of his Work. Dublin: The George Formby Society. OCLC 40991236.
- Smart, Sue; Bothway Howard, Richard (2011). It's Turned Out Nice Again!: The Authorized Biography of the Two George Formbys, Father and Son. Ely, Cambridgeshire: Melrose Books. ISBN 978-1-907732-59-1.
- Sweet, Matthew (2006). Shepperton Babylon: The Lost Worlds of British Cinema. London: Faber & Faber. ISBN 978-0-571-21298-9.
- Terry-Thomas; Daum, Terry (1990). Terry-Thomas Tells Tales. London: Robson Books. ISBN 978-0-86051-662-0.
- Tranquada, Jim (2012). The Ukulele: a History. Honolulu, HI: University of Hawaii Press. ISBN 978-0-8248-3544-6.
- Whitcomb, Ian (2012). Ukulele Heroes: The Golden Age. Milwaukee, WI: Hal Leonard Books. ISBN 978-1-4584-1654-4.
