= John Caughie =

British academic

John Caughie is a British academic, specialising in film and television studies.

== Life ==
Professor of Film and Television Studies at the University of Glasgow, his books include Theories of Authorship, A Companion to British and Irish Cinema and Television Drama: Realism, Modernism, and British Culture. He is on the editorial board of the British film and television journal, Screen, and is a Council member of the Arts and Humanities Research Council, U.K.
