= Much Too Shy =

- Opening title card
- Directed by: Marcel Varnel
- Written by: Walter Greenwood (screen adaptation); Michael Vaughan (additional scenes); John L. Arthur; Jack S. Marks
- Based on: original story by Ronald Frankau
- Produced by: Marcel Varnel; Ben Henry (associate producer)
- Starring: George Formby; Kathleen Harrison
- Cinematography: Arthur Crabtree
- Edited by: Max Brenner; Kitty Spreckley
- Music by: Harry Bidgood (uncredited)
- Production company: Columbia British Productions
- Distributed by: Columbia Pictures Corporation (UK)
- Release date: 12 October 1942; (UK)
- Running time: 92 minutes
- Country: United Kingdom
- Language: English
- Box office: £140,919 (UK)

Much Too Shy is a 1942 British comedy film directed by Marcel Varnel and starring George Formby, Kathleen Harrison, Hilda Bayley and Eileen Bennett. It was written by Walter Greenwood, Michael Vaughan, John L. Arthur and Jack S. Marks based on an original story by Ronald Frankau.

== Plot summary ==
A simple handyman (Formby) is also an amateur artist. He gets into trouble when the head and shoulders portraits of some prominent local women are sold without his knowledge to an advertising agency and are published with nude bodies added to them.

== Cast ==
- George Formby as George Andy
- Kathleen Harrison as Amelia Peabody
- Hilda Bayley as Lady Driscoll
- Eileen Bennett as Jackie Somers
- Joss Ambler as Sir George Driscoll
- Jimmy Clitheroe as Jimmy
- Frederick Burtwell as Harefield
- Brefni O'Rorke as Somers
- Eric Clavering as Robert Latimer
- Gibb McLaughlin as Reverend Sheepshanks
- Peter Gawthorne as Counsel
- Valentine Dyall as Defendant's Counsel
- Gus McNaughton as Manager of Commercial Art School
- Wally Patch as policeman
- Charles Hawtrey as Osbert, the art student

== Songs ==
Formby's featured songs are:

- "They Laughed When I Started to Play" (Formby/Fred E. Cliffe)
- "Talking to the Moon About You" (Dorothy Day)
- "Delivering the Morning Milk" (Formby/Harry Gifford/Cliffe)
- Andy the Handy Man" (Eddie Latta)

== Critical reception ==
The Monthly Film Bulletin wrote: "This is a good enough example of a Formby film. He is given several ukulele-accompanied songs to sing and is as daft as ever. The film does not move so quickly as those in which he had another director, and his leading lady, Eileen Bennett, is a little too 'jodhpur' even for a prosperous farmer's daughter who delivers the milk as a sideline. In Jimmy Clitheroe, however, has appeared a competent British child actor who with a little more experience may become first class."

Kine Weekly wrote: "The fooling is, at times, a little obvious and a trifle over-ripe, but in spite of its fluctuations in quality and a rather shaky start, it gathers a substantial harvest of laughs. ... George Formby puts over a lively and resourceful performance in the lead, and Jimmy Clitheroe, a clever juvenile with a fascinating North Country accent, not only makes an irresistible stooge, but nearly steals the picture."

Halliwell's Film Guide called the film "a slightly vulgar and talkative farce which restricts the star".

A Radio Times reviewer commented, "although he was still Britain's biggest box office attraction, George Formby was already showing signs of the novelty fatigue that would result in the collapse of his screen career four years later...The cheeky wit that informed so many of Formby's songs is to the fore in this contrived comedy, but the storyline about the handyman with aspirations to become an artist simply isn't strong enough to sustain so much smutty innuendo".
