= Let George Do It! =

- US cinema poster
- Directed by: Marcel Varnel
- Written by: Basil Dearden; John Dighton; Angus MacPhail; Austin Melford
- Produced by: Michael Balcon
- Starring: George Formby; Phyllis Calvert; Garry Marsh
- Cinematography: Ronald Neame
- Edited by: Ray Pitt
- Music by: Ernest Irving; Eddie Latta
- Production companies: Associated Talking Pictures; Ealing Studios
- Distributed by: ABFD (UK)
- Release date: 12 July 1940 (UK)
- Running time: 82 minutes
- Country: United Kingdom
- Language: English

Let George Do It! (also known as Murder in Bergen; US title: To Hell With Hitler) is a 1940 British black-and-white comedy musical war film directed by Marcel Varnel and starring George Formby. It was written by Basil Dearden, John Dighton, Angus MacPhail and Austin Melford. It was produced by Michael Balcon for Associated Talking Pictures and its successor, Ealing Studios, and distributed in the UK by ABFD. This was the first comedy from this studio to deal directly with the Second World War.

== Plot ==
At the beginning of the Second World War, before Germany invaded Norway, a ukulele player in a British dance band playing at a Bergen hotel, is found shot dead during a radio broadcast of the band's show. It turns out he was a British agent keeping an eye on the band leader, Mark Mendes, who is suspected of being a German agent passing on information about British shipping to German U-boats, using a code concealed in the radio broadcasts.

When Mendes calls a musician's agent in London for a replacement, British Intelligence tries to send another agent in his place. However, through a series of mistakes in a blacked out Dover, ukulele player George Hepplewhite, who is on his way to Blackpool, is put on the boat to Bergen instead of the new agent. When he arrives, the receptionist at the hotel, Mary Wilson, who is another British agent, makes contact but eventually realises the mistake. George, however, is totally unaware and starts working with the band, although Mendes is suspicious of him. Eventually Mary tells George what is going on, and together they manage to find what the code is and alert the Royal Navy.

When Mendes discovers that his code has been broken, he gives George a cup of coffee containing a truth serum, and George reveals that he and Mary are British spies. George, drugged, is left in his room, where he dreams of flying to Germany and giving Hitler a right hook. Eventually, he flees to join Mary on board a ship, but it has already left. So he hides in a motorboat which takes Mendes to a German U-boat, with the intent to torpedo British troop ships as well as the ship that Mary is on. George manages to get on board and alert Mary's ship over the U-boat's radio. After a series of chaotic incidents on board, where George accidentally launches the U-boat's torpedoes and thus tells the British Navy where to find it, he hides in one of the empty torpedo tubes. So when Mendes tries to torpedo Mary's ship, he shoots out George instead, who flies through the air and lands on the ship deck, thus reuniting with Mary.

== Cast ==
- George Formby as George Hepplewhite
- Phyllis Calvert as Mary Wilson
- Garry Marsh as Mark Mendez
- Romney Brent as Slim Selwyn
- Bernard Lee as Oscar
- Coral Browne as Iris
- Helena Pickard as Oscar's wife
- Percy Walsh as Schwartz
- Ronald Shiner as the clarinetist
- Ben Williams as radio operator on SS Macaulay (uncredited)
- Jack Hobbs as Conway
- Torin Thatcher as the U-Boat Commander

== Release ==
The film premiered at the Empire, Leicester Square in London on 12 July 1940.

== Reception ==
=== Box office ===
According to Kinematograph Weekly it was the most successful films at the British box office in August 1940.

=== Critical ===
The Monthly Film Bulletin wrote: "The plot is full of situations for Formby, which are fully exploited. He is given more opportunity to play his ukulele than in his other films and he also rises to the occasion in a more than usually dramatic plot."

According to Vic Pratt writing for the BFI's Screenonline website, it is "one of the best constructed and most consistently amusing of the George Formby comedies."
