= David Bret =

British biographer

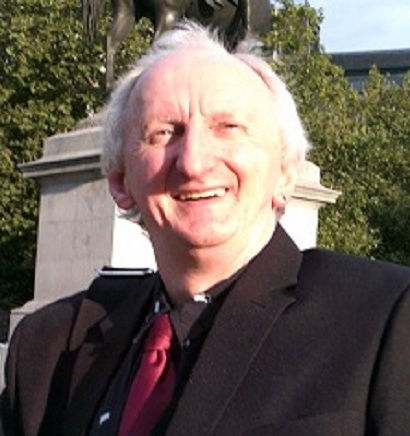
David Bret

David Bret (born 8 November 1954) is a British author of show business biographies. He chiefly writes on the private life of film stars and singers.

== Biographies ==
Bret has written a number of biographies for several publishers. Many of these have focused on the private or intimate lives of entertainment celebrities. Lewis Jones, in the Telegraph wrote that Bret "for decades has churned out sensationalist biographies of such figures as Diana Dors, Barbra Streisand and Tallulah Bankhead."

=== Clark Gable ===
In Clark Gable: Tormented Star Bret deals at length with Gable's sex life and particularly his sex with other men. In the New York Times Sunday Book Review, Ada Calhoun wrote "How does Bret, the author of numerous celebrity biographies, know so much about Hollywood stars’ sex lives? Judging by this new book's convoluted wording, he really doesn't." She also wrote: "For all its smut, the book is painfully unsexy. ... And yet Bret undermines his own arguments. ... 'Clark Gable' teems with innuendo and exclamation points, but still presents a thoroughly joyless view of old Hollywood."

=== George Formby ===
In George Formby: A Troubled Genius Bret explores the "innocent innuendo" of a once hugely popular music-hall performer. Jonathan Glancey writing for The Guardian described it as "David Bret's thoughtful book about the life and unhappiness of an entertainer who would surely never make it anywhere near the top now." Through this, he came under large scrutiny from the [[George Formby Society]] for claims about George, his relationship with his wife Beryl, and the Formby family.

=== Greta Garbo ===
Greta Garbo: Divine Star was criticized by Lewis Jones, who wrote: "There is little new to say about Garbo’s life, and the best one can expect of a retelling is insight, wit and a shapely narrative, none of which is provided by Divine Star." Lewis complains that:

Bret makes many errors. Of Garbo’s visit to New York in 1925, for example, he notes that she met Humphrey Bogart, one of "the biggest stars of the day", when he made his name with The Petrified Forest in 1936. He thinks that the Académie française is a drama school. And so on. He also writes incredibly badly, ..."

Christopher Fowler was more positive about Divine Star. In The Independent he wrote:

Garbo biographies are virtually an industry in themselves. But David Bret is after something more. Digging into previously unsourced material and collating fresh stories from friends and fellow studio employees, he tries to close the two major gaps in his subject's life.

Fowler concludes by saying: "Bret's biography is rightly partisan and fully prepared to name enemies, which makes it a bracingly pleasurable read in these anodyne times."

=== Joan Crawford ===
Writing in The Washington Post, Carolyn See has a very negative view of Bret's biography of Joan Crawford, calling it "one of the ickiest film biographies I've ever read."

See writes:

But suppose you gorged on old movie magazines and ghostwritten gobbledygook and pieces of weird gossip you overheard and then decided to rewrite what has been written and rewritten again for 80 years or so, and you picked as your subject Joan Crawford, "gay icon par excellence"? You'd produce something like David Bret's new biography.

Hollywood was not as it seemed -- sexually. That's the author's main theme here. (The "Hollywood Martyr" business of the subtitle is purely an afterthought.) Couples lived in "lavender" or "twilight-tandem" marriages.

See accuses Bret of failing to cite sources for statements and quotes in the work, and of engaging in unfounded speculation.

Quotations abound in his book, but there are no footnotes, and the index indicates only on what page people are mentioned. I think it's fair to say that "Joan Crawford: Hollywood Martyr" is made up of cryptic, if breezy, assertions, like: "Aspects of Joan Crawford's extraordinary, complex psyche were incorporated into many of her films ... but such was the naivety of America during the Depression, few made the connection. The same may be said for Crawford, gay icon par excellence. Few people realised, at the time these events were unfolding, of [sic] her fondness for gay and bisexual men -- on account of their fear of being exposed by the media. Three of her husbands slotted into this category, as did many of her lovers, including Clark Gable." This is cheesiness "par excellence," as the author himself might say, and apparently little more than speculation.

See concludes that "Ultimately, it's an enormous insult to gays, assuming, as it does, that mindless cattiness and restroom innuendo are the accepted small talk of homosexuals everywhere."

An unsigned review in Publishers Weekly is more neutral, writing: "Bret chronicles her films, her feud with Bette Davis and dismisses her daughter's Mommie Dearest tirade, but he revels in Hollywood's sexual excesses, and fans who crave a lively insider view will most appreciate this bio."

=== Maria Callas ===
An unsigned review in Publishers Weekly says of Maria Callas: The Tigress and the Lamb that

Bret, clearly a Callas aficionado, glosses over the controversial aspects of the voice and emphasizes her total commitment to her art, her brilliant resurrection of nearly forgotten bel canto roles and her extraordinary dramatic skills. He also recounts all the sensational details of Callas's life .... The emphasis is on scandal rather than music in this racy biography..."

=== Errol Flynn ===
An unsigned, undated review in Publishers Weekly says of Errol Flynn: Satan's Angel that "Bret, however, takes on the Flynn mythology in this new biography." The review goes on to say that:

With the same gusto and verve of his subject, Bret plows through Flynn's escapades and accomplishments. It may be difficult for some to reconcile Bret's assessment of Flynn as some sort of hard-living heroic figure, or an "essentially good man," after reading about the actor's deplorable treatment of women, his sexual voyeurism, his penchant for underage girls and his hatred of Jews.

=== Edith Piaf ===
An unsigned, undated review in Publishers Weekly says of The Piaf Legend that "Bret presents little new information–and is no more successful than his predecessors in uncovering the reasons for Piaf's enormous appeal."

=== Maurice Chevalier ===
An unsigned, undated review in Publishers Weekly says of Maurice Chevalier: Up on Top of a Rainbow: "In this entertaining look at the life of Maurice Chevalier (1888–1972), Bret, author of The Piaf Legend and The Mistinquett Legend, again shows his prowess as a chronicler of French stars." The review goes on to say: "Bret supports his biography with authoritative sources, although on occasion his facts are askew, as when he makes a reference to 'John F. Kennedy and his mother, Ethel.'"

=== Morrissey ===
An unsigned, undated review in Publishers Weekly says of Morrissey: Scandal & Passion:

Thankfully, author Bret's profile is not the sensationalist expose one might expect given this volume's titillating subtitle. ... Bret's restraint is downright gentlemanly. In fact, this is an appropriately English take on a uniquely English personality, to the extent that at least half of the author's references require an intimate knowledge of British pop culture, circa 1960–80. ... the book is unfortunately light on biographical detail, but it's a compelling (if sometimes fawning) exploration of the cult of Morrissey nonetheless.

=== Mistinguett ===
An unsigned, undated review in Publishers Weekly says of The Mistinguett Legend:

Bret focuses on her many eccentricities, connections with Parisian low life and multitudinous love affairs.... He rounds out his account with examples of her ribald lyrics and descriptions of her flamboyant costumes, in a book that says more about Mistinguett's bizarre lifestyle than about her art.

== Other work ==
Bret has also written many newspaper and magazine articles, for instance, for The Stage, and he has lectured at the University of Chicago. He had adapted songs from the original French for his godmother, actress Jacqueline Danno, and for his friend the chanteuse Barbara. She commissioned him to adapt her theme song, Ma plus belle histoire d'amour, into English. Bret also appears in the Italian documentary, 'Rudy', which tells the story of Rudolph Valentino. He also made a trio of documentaries for the E! channel in the USA, discussing Freddie Mercury, Valentino and Tallulah Bankhead. In other documentaries/television retrospectives for the BBC and other major channels he discusses Maria Callas, George Formby, Gracie Fields, Edith Piaf, Maurice Chevalier, Morrissey, Marlene Dietrich and Elvis Presley.

His novels are; The "John Dynham & The Wars of the Roses" trilogy: "A Devon Squire"; "Nicholas Carew"; "Thomas & Tom: A Spiritual Brotherhood". "Darvinz of Zarumna"; "Chanson, A Story of Forbidden Love During The German Occupation of Paris"; "Dante Alfonso: Italian God of the Silent Screen".

Autobiographies: Putting One's Head Above The Parapet, DbBooks ISBN 978-1-539-53430-3; "Old Bastard": My Psychotic Father", DbBooks ISBN 978-1-539-83088-7

== Criticisms ==
Bret is regarded by some as controversial in his writings and has been compared to Charles Higham and Kenneth Anger ("The effect is Hollywood Babylon lite.") His works have also attracted scrutiny for their sexual detail.
