= The Winner Records =

- Founded: 1912
- Founder: James Hough
- Defunct: 1935
- Status: Inactive
- Genre: Pop, classical, jazz
- Country of origin: UK

The Winner Records was a United Kingdom-based record label from 1912 onwards. Its records were manufactured by the Edison Bell Record Works, London. This company, founded by James Hough, had originated in the early 1890s as an importer of Edison and Columbia phonograph cylinders; from 1898 Hough had also made cylinder records, initially using a separate company, Edisonia. When Edison set up his own European operation in 1904, the import franchise was withdrawn, but the name Edison Bell remained in use. From 1909 the official name of Edison-Bell was J. E. Hough Ltd.

Winner Records were designed to offer well-recorded and pressed gramophone records at a budget price. Winner records, with black or red labels, were mostly of a popular music type, although they included some items of musical distinction, such as early recordings by John Barbirolli, then a child-prodigy performer on the violoncello, and nearly all of the discography of Marie Novello, one of the last students of Theodor Leschetizky. In the early 1920s the company introduced a higher-quality series, Velvet Face Records, so called because the material of which they were made was allegedly smoother than that used by other manufacturers. These had green labels, and the catalogue included some ambitious items, such as an abridged version (1925) of Edward Elgar's oratorio The Dream of Gerontius and, from Novello, what has been reported as the first recording of Bach's Toccata and Fugue in D minor, BWV 565 (arranged for piano by Carl Tausig) and a complete recording of Mendelssohn's First Piano Concerto, her sole recording of a work extending over more than two record sides.

In 1919, Winner was the first to issue a recording by a jazz band.

All recordings prior to 1922 were made by Edison Bell in London. Subsequently, several recordings were leased from Star Piano Company, Emerson Records, and Paramount Records. Subsequent to 1925, recordings from Crown and Plaza Music Company were used.

Edison-Bell was eventually absorbed by England-based company Decca Records. Decca introduced a new series of Winner records that were primarily sourced from American Vocalion. These were discontinued January 1935. More than 3500 Winner gramophone discs had been issued. A full listing of Winner records is published by the CLPGS.

== See also ==
- List of record labels
