= McNamara's Band =

1889 song by Shamus O'Connor and John J. Stamford

"McNamara's Band" (originally "MacNamara's Band") is a popular song composed in 1889 by Shamus O'Connor (music) and John J. Stamford (lyrics). The song was performed as a music hall routine by William J. "Billy" Ashcroft. It has been recorded by a number of artists, most notably Bing Crosby. The song is associated with Ireland and often performed on St. Patrick's Day in the United States and at the end of half time in Tottenham Hotspur Stadium.

== Background ==
Stamford, the composer of the song, was the manager of the Alhambra Theatre in Belfast and the song was written expressly for the theatre's owner, the Irish-American music hall veteran Billy Ashcroft. Ashcroft, often referred to as "The Solid Man" for his association with the Edward Harrigan song "Muldoon, the Solid Man," had earlier in his career in the U.S. performed a blackface routine called "The Lively (or 'Musical') Moke," which interspersed comic song and dance with brief performances on multiple instruments. "McNamara's Band" gave him scope for a similar Irish "character song."

Irish music hall historians Watters and Murtagh described Ashcroft's performance of the routine: "Here 'McNamara' breaks into a dancing quick-step March up and down the Stage, his nimble fingers snatching up one instrument after another, blowing the bassoon, tootling the flute, beating the drum with the knob of his baton - A One-Man Band."

Modern listeners associate the song with the version recorded on 6 December 1945 by Bing Crosby, with a set of lyrics credited to "The Three Jesters." Released on Decca Records in early 1946, the song became a Top Ten hit for Crosby. It remains one of his most popular songs and is often performed on St. Patrick's Day in the United States. A slightly earlier recording of this song appeared in the 1945 film The Way to the Stars. Stanley Holloway leads the crowd in a pub close to a Royal Air Force base during World War II.

It has been claimed that the song was inspired by an actual band, the St Mary's Fife and Drum Band, formed in Limerick in 1885. In the late 19th century the band featured four brothers, Patrick, John, Michael and Thomas McNamara, and became famous for playing shows all across Ireland. Patrick was a prize-winning bandmaster of this band. In 1905 he emigrated from Limerick to New York, where he reunited with his brother Thomas, and formed ‘McNamara’s band’ with Patrick "Patsy" Salmon, another Limerick emigre. After Salmon left the group Patrick and Thomas formed "McNamara's Trio" with Thomas on piccolo, Patrick on violin and Patrick's daughter, Eileen, on the piano. The trio recorded and released several songs for Vocalion Records.

John McNamara served with the Royal Munster Fusiliers during the Second Boer War and First World War. He was killed in action on 9 May 1915, and his body was never recovered after the war; his name is today commemorated on the Le Touret Memorial, France.

In 2021, Dr Derek Mulcahy wrote a book on the life of Patrick McNamara entitled 'The Leader of the Band, Patrick J. McNamara and McNamara’s Band', published by the Limerick Writers' Centre. This book tells the life history of Patrick J. McNamara and his ‘McNamara’s Band’. Recordings of Irish music became very popular amongst the Irish in America in the early twentieth century. P. J. McNamara saw this opportunity and his band cut discs with various record companies from 1921 up to his death in 1927. As well as recording as the McNamara Trio, they also cut records as a quartet and as McNamara’s Orchestra. The book included two CDs with 44 of the 48 recordings McNamara made in New York from 1921 up to 1927, which add to the musical contribution of The Leader of the Band.

P. J. McNamara and ‘McNamara’s Band’ are part of a great Irish musical tradition that left its mark in Ireland and America.

== Lyrics ==
The most widely used set of lyrics is the adaptation by Crosby's "Three Jesters" (Red Latham, Wamp Carlson and Guy Bonham).

=== Original lyrics ===
My name is McNamara, I'm the Leader of the Band,
And tho' we're small in number we're the best in all the land.
Oh! I am the Conductor, and we often have to play
With all the best musicianers you hear about to-day.

(Chorus)
When the drums go bang, the cymbals clang, the horns will blaze away,
MacCarthy puffs the ould bassoon while Doyle the pipes will play;
Oh! Hennessy Tennessy tootles the flute, my word 'tis something grand,
Oh! a credit to Ould Ireland, boys, is McNamara's Band!

Whenever an election's on, we play on either side-
The way we play our fine ould airs fills Irish hearts with pride.
Oh! if poor Tom Moore was living now, he'd make yez understand
That none could do him justice like ould McNamara's Band.

(Chorus)

We play at wakes and weddings, and at every county ball,
And at any great man's funeral we play the "Dead March in Saul,"
When the Prince of Wales to Ireland came, he shook me by the hand,
And said he'd never heard the like of "McNamara's Band."

=== Three Jesters' version ===
The Three Jesters' version is different: The politics of "Ould Ireland" are removed; the words are made more "Irish," e.g. "Me name is..." rather than "My name is...;" and stereotypes are added in the final lines to make the selection essentially a comedy song.

Oh!, me name is McNamara. I'm the Leader of the Band.
Although we're few in numbers, we're the finest in the land.
We play at wakes and weddin's, and at every fancy ball,
And when we play the funerals we play the march from "Saul."

(Chorus)

Oh! the drums go bang, and the cymbals clang, and the horns they blaze away.
McCarthy pumps the old bassoon while I the pipes do play.
And Hennessey Tennessey tootles the flute, and the music is somethin' grand.
A credit to old Ireland is McNamara's Band!

Right now we are rehearsin' for a very swell affair,
The annual celebration, all the gentry will be there.
When General Grant to Ireland came, he took me by the hand,
Says he, "I never saw the likes of McNamara's Band."

(Chorus)

Oh my name is Uncle Yulius and from Sweden I did come,
To play with McNamara's Band and beat the big bass drum.
And when I march along the street the ladies think I'm grand,
They shout "There's Uncle Yulius playing with an Irish band."

(no chorus here)

Oh! I wear a bunch of shamrocks and a uniform of green,
And I am the funniest looking Swede that you have ever seen.
There is O'Briens and Ryans and Sheehans and Meehans, they come from Ireland,
But by Yimminy, I'm the only Swede in McNamara's Band.

=== Others ===
The English Premier League football team Tottenham Hotspur F.C. adopted the song as their club anthem, with one verse changed:

Oh the whistle blows the cockerel crows, and now we're in the game,
It's up to you, you Lilywhites, to play the Tottenham way.
And when we've gone and won the league I'm sure you'll understand,
The famous Tottenham Hotspur are the best team in the land.

== In popular culture ==
- "MacNamara's Band" (note correct spelling) is a club song for Tottenham Hotspur F.C. a Premier League Football Club in North London. The connection to the club may be that the song was written in Barnet, also North London and not far from the Spurs Ground. Spurs is the well known nickname for Tottenham Hotspur. The song was adopted by Spurs long before popular legend cites its adoption after Northern Irish international Danny Blanchflower joined the club in 1954. Whilst the song was used at this time and underwent something of a revival during the Glory Glory years of the early 1960s, its use at White Hart Lane predates either. It was played at the beginning of every Tottenham home game for over 30 years, and is still used as the players return to the pitch at the start of the second half.
- The melody is used in Harold Baum's "The Pentose Phosphate Shunt" in The Biochemists' Songbook.
- "McNamara's Band" is a nickname for fans of former Syracuse University basketball player and later head coach Gerry McNamara.
- In addition, the song was part of a sing-a-long in the Famous Studios animated short, The Emerald Isle (1949).
