= TISM discography =

Band discography

Australian alternative rock group TISM have released seven studio albums.

== Albums ==
=== Studio albums ===
Title	Details	Peak chart positions	Certifications
Title	Details	AUS	Certifications
Great Truckin' Songs of the Renaissance	Released: 26 September 1988; Label: Elvis Records (ER 1206); Format: 2×LP, 2×cassette, CD	48	
Hot Dogma	Released: 1 October 1990; Label: Phonogram (846901-1); Format: LP, cassette, CD	86	
Machiavelli and the Four Seasons	Released: 4 May 1995; Label: genre b.goode (G002); Format: Cassette, CD	8	ARIA: Gold
www.tism.wanker.com	Released: 1 June 1998; Label: genre b.goode (G0012); Format: CD	26	
De RigueurMortis	Released: 29 October 2001; Label: genre b.goode (TISM007); Format: CD, download	24	
The White Albun	Released: 24 June 2004; Label: genre b.goode; Format: CD, 2×LP, download	— (Note: The White Albun did not enter the ARIA top 100 album chart, but peaked at number 14 on the DVD Chart.)	
Death to Art	Released: 4 October 2024; Label: genre b.goode, DRW; Format: CD, LP, download	15	

=== Live albums ===
Title	Details	Peak chart positions
Title	Details	AUS
Machines Against the Rage (aka Machiavelli – Live)	Released: December 1996; Label: genre b.goode (G007); Format: CD, cassette, digital download, 2×LP; Recorded live in Melbourne in 1995; Originally released as the bonus disc with a special edition of Machiavelli and the Four Seasons; Later issued as a standalone digital release in 2009 and a double LP edition in November 2022	87
Live at the Corner Hotel 30 May 1988	Released: 10 April 2020; Label: genre b.goode, Black Box Records/ MGM Distribution; Format: CD (limited), DD, streaming; Recorded 30 May 1988	—
On Behalf of TISM, I Would Like to Concede We Have Lost the Election	Released: December 2020; Label: genre b.goode; Format: CD, LP, Digital download; Recorded at the Earthcore Festival, 27 November 2004	—
Jesus Education Salvation Uniform Squad	Released: 5 November 2021; Label: N/A; Format: Digital download; Recorded at the Hi-Fi Bar in Melbourne, 13 November 2004	—

=== Compilation albums ===
Title	Details	Peak chart positions
Title	Details	AUS
Gentlemen, Start Your Egos	Released: 1991; Label: Shock (SHOCK CD0017); Format: Cassette, CD	—
Best Off	Released: 29 July 2002; Label: genre b.goode (TISM010); Format: CD, 2×CD, digital download	44
Collected Remixes	Released: 17 September 2021; Label: genre b.goode (GBG0017); Format: 2×LP	—
Collected Versus: The Complete TISM Singles	Released: 19 August 2022; Label: genre b.goode (GBG0024); Seeland (538; US only); Format: 2×LP, 2×CD; Singles compilation; Australian edition contains Collected Remixes on the second disc; Also released in the US with an alternative second disc titled Kill Americans – A TISM Primer	—

=== Box sets ===
Title	Details
Collected Recordings 1986–1993	Released: December 1995; Label: Genre B.Goode (G006); Format: 4×CD
Defecate on My Face	Released: August 2022; Label: Genre B.Goode (GBG0020); Format: 7" + 12" + CD, digital download
Wankerbox	Released: May 2023; Label: Genre B.Goode (GBG0027, GBG0029); Format: 7LP, 4CD, digital download
The Beasts of Suburban	Released: November 2023; Label: Genre B.Goode (GBG0033, GBG0034); Format: 4LP, 3CD, digital download; Alternatively titled Beasts Box
Australia the Lucky Cunt	Released: March 2025; Label: Genre B.Goode (GBG0045, GBG0046); Format: 4LP, 2CD, digital download; Alternatively titled Australia Box
Machiavelli and the Four Seasons	Released: July 2025; Label: Genre B.Goode (GBG0050, GBG0051); Format: 5LP, 3CD, digital download

=== Demo albums ===
Title	Details
This Is Serious Mum	Released: 25 November 1984; Label: self-released; Format: Cassette, CD, LP; Released in limited numbers at This Is Serious Mum's second live show at University of Melbourne on 25 November 1984; Reissued on vinyl, CD and cassette on 9 July 2021
Punt Road	Recorded: 16 September 1987; Released: 9 July 2021; Label: Genre B.Goode; Format: CD, LP; Recorded during rehearsals for the "40 Years – Then Death" single launch
Hot Dogma (Sing Sing Sessions)	Recorded: 17–18 March 1990; Released: 18 August 2023; Label: Genre B.Goode; Format: CD, LP; Demos for Hot Dogma; Six songs previously released on Collected Recordings 1986-1993

=== Home demo tapes ===
Title	Details
Great Truckin' Songs of the Renaissance	Recorded: 30 December 1982; Nine song demo tape recorded at Ron Hitler-Barassi's house; Unreleased; not to be confused with the later studio album of the same name; "The Ballad of the Semitic Nazi" excerpted on the studio album Great Truckin' Songs of the Renaissance; Four songs released on bonus CD included with limited edition copies of Best Off
Form and Meaning Reach Ultimate Communion	Recorded: July 1983; Twelve song demo tape; Unreleased; not to be confused with the later mini-album of the same name; Four songs released on bonus CD included with limited edition copies of Best Off
Hooked on Crap	Recorded: July 1983; Thirteen song demo tape; Unreleased; "The Art/Income Dialectic" released on Collected Recordings 1986-1993; "Kevin Borich Expressionism" excerpted on Great Truckin' Songs of the Renaissance
It's Novel! It's Unique! It's Shithouse!	Recorded: September–October 1983; Twenty-four song demo tape; Unreleased; "Jack Elliot's Turf Whinge" excerpted on Great Truckin' Songs of the Renaissance; Five songs released on bonus CD included with limited edition copies of Best Off
TISM V – Harshness, Reality, That's What It's All About / We Live in Oil	Recorded: February 1984; Twelve song demo tape; Unreleased; "Johnny to B. or Not to B. Goode" excerpted on Great Truckin' Songs of the Renaissance; Edited version of "Unknown, Unacknowledged, Unforgettable, Underpants" released on bonus CD included with limited edition copies of Best Off; Full version of "Unknown, Unacknowledged, Unforgettable, Underpants" released as a hidden track on the 2021 CD reissue of This Is Serious Mum demo
If You Want the Toilet, You're in It	Recorded: April–November 1984; Twenty-six song demo tape; Unreleased; "If You Want the Toilet, You're in It" released on Collected Recordings 1986-1993; "Life is Fairly Silly, Really" released on bonus CD included with limited edition copies of Best Off
Muggy Climates in My Jockettes	Recorded: August–September 1985; Thirteen song demo tape; Unreleased; Two songs released on bonus CD included with limited edition copies of Best Off; Eight songs released on the 2022 Defecate on My Face box set
There's More Men in Children Than Wisdom Knows	Recorded: January–March 1986; Twelve song demo tape; Unreleased; "Slave to the Economist" excerpted on Great Truckin' Songs of the Renaissance
It's a Screaming World and You're Just Another Screamer	Recorded: June–August 1986; Eleven song demo tape; Unreleased; Three songs released on bonus CD included with limited edition copies of Best Off
The Vic Hugo Experience – Are You Miserable?	Recorded: October 1986; Twelve song demo tape; "The Love You Take Equals The Love You Make So Baby Let Me Bang Your Box" released on Collected Recordings 1986-1993
Tissongs	Recorded: February–September 1987; Thirty-nine song demo tape; Unreleased; "I'm Gonna Treat Ya To A Neitschze Double Feature" released on bonus CD included with limited edition copies of Best Off
Free Nelson Mandella – With Every Record!	Recorded: November 1988; Twenty-one song demo tape; Unreleased
Three Blake and a Dollar's Worth of Chips	Recorded: December 1988; Twenty-two song demo tape; Unreleased
No Penis, No God	Recorded: January 1996; Fourteen-song demo tape; Released April 2024 on limited-edition vinyl; Nine songs previously released on the iTunes version of www.tism.wanker.com

=== Miscellaneous ===
Title	Details
The TISM Omni-Album	Released: 21 December 2020; Label: Genre B.Goode; Format: Vinyl; Around 1 hour and 45 minutes of silence pressed on a transparent vinyl disc; An optional second disc was also available separately, the two-disc version is known as The TISM Deluxe Omni-Album

== Extended plays ==
Title	Details	Peak chart positions
Title	Details	AUS
Form and Meaning Reach Ultimate Communion	Released: 1986; Label: Elvis Records; Format: 12" mini-LP	—
Beasts of Suburban	Released: July 1992; Label: Shock; Format: CD, cassette	131
Australia the Lucky Cunt (Re-issue title: Censored Due to Legal Advice)	Released: 3 September 1993; Label: Shock; Format: CD, cassette	—
The "C" Word	Released: 15 December 2023; Label: Genre B. Goode; Format: Streaming, digital download, CD, vinyl	—

== Charted singles ==
List of singles that had a chart position within a national top 200
Title	Year	Peak chart positions		Album
Title	Year	AUS	GER	Album
"The History of Western Civilization"	1990	117	—	Hot Dogma
"Lose Your Delusion 1"	1993	131	—	Australia the Lucky Cunt
"Jung Talent Time"	1995	109	—	Machiavelli and the Four Seasons
"(He'll Never Be An) Ol' Man River"	1995	23	—	Machiavelli and the Four Seasons
"Greg! The Stop Sign!!"	1995	59	—	Machiavelli and the Four Seasons
"Garbage"	1996	118	—	Machiavelli and the Four Seasons
"Shut Up – The Footy's on the Radio"	1997	90	—	Non-album single
"Yob"	1997	118	—	www.tism.wanker.com
"I Might Be a Cunt, but I'm Not a Fucking Cunt"	1998	90	—	www.tism.wanker.com
"Whatareya?"	1998	66	—	www.tism.wanker.com
"Honk If You Love Fred Durst"	2001	121	—	De RigueurMortis
"Everyone Else Has Had More Sex Than Me"	2004	— (Note: "Everyone Else Has Had More Sex Than Me" was released as a radio promotional single, and was ineligible to chart in Australia in 2004)	63	The White Albun
