= Best Off (album) =

Compilation album by TISM
- Released: 29 July 2002
- Recorded: 1985–2000
- Genre: Alternative rock
- Length: 61:00
- Label: genre b.goode /FMR
- Producer: TISM

TISM chronology
De RigueurMortis (2001)	Best Off (2002)	The White Albun (2004)

Best Off (stylised as tism.bestoff.) is a compilation album by the Australian alternative rock band TISM, released on 29 July 2002. The album peaked at No. 44 on the ARIA Charts.

== Reception ==
Bronius Zumeris from Beat magazine opined that "Offbeat wit and profanity litter their work" while "Cynics argue that they are a puerile, one joke band trying to flog a dying horse" and the collection "is not a flawless appraisal of their 15 odd years of cultural/musical terror. But it does collate much of the essential TISM for the consumer society."

== Track listing ==
Best Off
No.	Title	Album	Length
1.	"Defecate on My Face"	Defecate on My Face 7"	4:50
2.	"Death, Death, Death"	Machines Against the Rage	3:16
3.	"Saturday Night Palsy"	Great Truckin' Songs of the Renaissance	2:54
4.	"I'm Interested in Apathy"	Great Truckin' Songs of the Renaissance	2:50
5.	"I Drive a Truck"	Great Truckin' Songs of the Renaissance	3:02
6.	"40 Years - Then Death"	Great Truckin' Songs of the Renaissance	3:41
7.	"The History of Western Civilisation"	Hot Dogma	3:00
8.	"I'll 'Ave Ya"	Hot Dogma	2:14
9.	"Get Thee to a Nunnery"	The Beasts of Suburban	2:41
10.	"Lillee Caught Dilley Bowled Milli Vanilli"	Machines Against the Rage	2:54
11.	"(He'll Never Be An) Ol' Man River"	Machiavelli and the Four Seasons	2:24
12.	"Greg! The Stop Sign!!"	Machiavelli and the Four Seasons	3:28
13.	"All Homeboys Are Dickheads"	Machiavelli and the Four Seasons	3:07
14.	"Whatareya?"	www.tism.wanker.com	3:38
15.	"Five Yards"	De Rigueurmortis	3:14
16.	"Sid Viscous"	Previously unreleased	3:33
17.	"The Phillip Ruddock Blues"	Previously unreleased	7:13
18.	"Defecate on My Face" (MGF Remix, Sydney 2002)	Previously unreleased	3:33

=== Bonus disc ===
Initial copies of the album came with a bonus disc, This Is Serious Mum: A Collection of Bedroom Recordings 1982-1992, containing 25 unreleased bedroom demos spanning TISM's first ten years.

This Is Serious Mum: A Collection of Bedroom Recordings 1982-1992
No.	Title	Length
1.	"Eckermann is Very Silly"	2:58
2.	"The Ballad of the Semitic Nazi"	3:30
3.	"Yassa Ara-Thin-A-Go-Go"	4:57
4.	"I Go to Werribee"	3:01
5.	"Ladies and Gentlemen: The Judeo - Christian Ethic"	2:26
6.	"Ezra Pound, Axe-King: Part 1: The Ballad of J. Arthur White Australia Policy; Part 2: The Petty Bourgeois Revolution; Part 3: Art, Religion and the Neo-Classical Dialectic; Part 4: The Hairy Diadem"	3:21
7.	"The English-Speaking Peoples"	0:51
8.	"Doug Parkinson Sings Christie Allen"	2:59
9.	"I Await the Coming of the Scottish Third Reich"	2:40
10.	"A Tale of Two Faeces"	0:21
11.	"Almost Blue by Ian Curtis"	2:04
12.	"The Back Upon Which Jezza Jumped"	3:09
13.	"Jumpin' Jivin' Jimmy "The Ghost" Joyce"	3:21
14.	"Unknown, Unacknowledged, Unforgettable, Underpants"	3:20
15.	"Life is Fairly Silly, Really"	1:43
16.	"Landscape, Seascape, Escape"	2:27
17.	"I'm Gonna Sit Right Down and Whittle Away My Furniture"	2:26
18.	Untitled (titled "(Somewhere in This School...)" on the iTunes release)	3:46
19.	"How to End All Suffering"	2:34
20.	"Frenzy"	1:13
21.	"I'm Gonna Treat Ya to a Neitszche Double Feature"	2:17
22.	"You're Only as Good as Your Fans"	2:18
23.	"My Geronation"	2:23
24.	"This Morning I Had Work to Do"	2:56
25.	"Tu e La Tua Razza fa'un Culo"	1:13

- "The Ballad of the Semitic Nazi" and "Doug Parkinson Sings Christie Allen" previously appeared in excerpt form on Great Truckin' Songs of the Renaissance.
- The full version of "Unknown, Unacknowledged, Unforgettable, Underpants" would later appear as a hidden track on the 2021 remastered reissue of This Is Serious Mum, the band's 1984 demo tape.
- "You're Only as Good as Your Fans", "My Gerontation", "This Morning I Had Work to Do" and "Tu e La Tua Razza fa'un Culo" all reappeared on the 2025 boxset reissue of Australia the Lucky Cunt ("Tu e La Tua Razza..." as a vinyl-exclusive hidden track). The tracks were listed only as being recorded "sometime between 1990-92" on the original release of Best Off, but the boxset placed those recordings in November 1992.
  - The phrase tu e la tua razza vaffanculo, which "Tu e La Tua Razza..." alludes to, was first uttered in October 1991 on a demo recording of "Aussiemandias", which itself was included as a bonus track on the iTunes version of the band's 1992 EP The Beasts of Suburban and the 2023 box set of that album.
  - Lyrics from "My Gerontation" reappeared in the Australia the Lucky Cunt song "Jesus Pots the White Ball".

== Charts ==
Chart (2002)	Peak position
Australian Albums (ARIA)	44

== Release history ==
Release history and formats for Best Off
Region	Date	Format(s)	Edition	Label	Catalogue
Australia	July 2002	CD	Standard	genre b.goode	TISM010
Australia	July 2002	2×CD	Limited edition (with A Collection of Bedroom Recordings 1982-1992)	genre b.goode	TISM009
Australia	October 2009	Re-issue	Digital download	genre b.goode	—N/a
