= BFW =

BFW may refer to:

- Bayerische Flugzeugwerke AG, later Messerschmitt AG, German aircraft manufacturer
- Bleed from Within, Scottish heavy metal band
- Boiler feedwater
- "BFW", a song by TISM from their 2001 album De RigueurMortis
