= The White Albun =

Studio album by TISM
- Released: 24 June 2004
- Recorded: March 2003–March 2004
- Studio: TISM Mobile Recording Unit
- Genre: Alternative rock
- Length: 61:53
- Label: genre b.goode/Madman Entertainment
- Producer: TISM

TISM chronology
tism.bestoff. (2002)	The White Albun (2004)	Death to Art (2024)

Singles from The White Albun
- 1. "Everyone Else Has Had More Sex Than Me" Released: October 2004

Professional ratings
Review scores
Source	Rating
Adelaide Advertiser	5/5 stars
The Australian	4.5/5 stars
Herald Sun	4/5 stars
Rave (Brisbane)	4/5 stars

The White Albun is the sixth studio album by Australian alternative rock band TISM, released on 24 June 2004. The title is a reference to and deliberate misspelling of The White Album, an unofficial name for the album The Beatles.

The album was released as part of a larger package containing two DVDs. The first DVD is titled A Film by Antonionioni which is a live concert called Save Our TISM. The concept for the concert was a telethon called "Save Our TISM", in which the band have rejected a merger with Powderfinger and need to raise AU$1 million, otherwise they will split up. At the end of the concert, only AU$999 999 is raised, and TISM split up, with fans throwing $1 coins onto the stage as they walk off.

The second DVD is TISM: A Docunentary (keeping with the 'n' theme) which features interviews with the band, a history of TISM and rare or previously unreleased footage from TISM concerts, dating as far back as the band's first concert in December 1983.

The album was re-released on 10 November 2004 in a standard DVD case. On 17 September 2021, it was reissued on CD and double vinyl, with the CD including the "Save Our TISM" concert, albeit without the telethon interludes between songs, and the LP containing a bonus 7-inch EP, including four songs from the concert.

== Track listings ==
=== The White Albun ===
CD 1: The White Albun
No.	Title	Length
1.	"Everyone Else Has Had More Sex Than Me"	3:51
2.	"Bone Idol"	3:16
3.	"Message from a Big Day Out Port-a-Loo"	3:42
4.	"DJ Trevor"	3:25
5.	"I Rooted a Girl Who Rooted a Guy Who Rooted a Girl Who Rooted a Guy Who Rooted a Girl Who Rooted Shane Crawford"	4:13
6.	"The Birth of Uncool"	4:45
7.	"As Seen on Reality"	5:30
8.	"The Song of the Quarter Time Siren (Car Battery)"	2:52
9.	"Diffident Strokes"	3:40
10.	"Ken Bruce Has Gone Mad"	3:22
11.	"Sorted for D'n'M"	2:56
12.	"Cerebral Knievel"	5:15
13.	"Tonight Harry's Practice Visits the Home of Charlie "Bird" Parker"	5:43
14.	"Somebody Start a Fight or Something"	2:49
15.	"Neck It"	2:53
16.	"TISM Are Shit"	3:28
Total length:		61:53

"As Seen On Reality" samples "Launching Place, Pt. II", the B-side of Spectrum's 1970 single "I'll Be Gone". The lyric itself dates back to mid-1991, when it was demoed during The Beasts of Suburban sessions under the title "Credits".

=== A Docunentary ===
DVD 1: A Film By Antonionioni
No.	Title	Length
1.	"M.C. / Intro"	3:23
2.	"Untitled"	3:20
3.	"Death Death Death Amway Amway Amway"	3:14
4.	"I'm Interested in Apathy"	3:11
5.	"40 Years Then Death"	5:16
6.	"Sid Viscous"	3:14
7.	"Saturday Night Palsy"	3:08
8.	"M.C."	2:00
9.	"5 Yards"	3:04
10.	"Whatareya?"	3:39
11.	"Diatribe"	2:59
12.	"All Home Boys Are Dickheads"	3:19
13.	"Root"	3:26
14.	"Greg! The Stop Sign!!"	3:25
15.	"I'll 'ave Ya'"	3:23
16.	"(He'll Never Be An) Ol' Man River"	2:27
17.	"TISM Are Shit"	3:30
18.	"M.C."	1:31
19.	"I Drive a Truck"	2:12
20.	"B.F.W."	3:30
21.	"Defecate On My Face"	3:49
22.	"M.C. / End of Concert" (TISM Interviews)	2:30
Total length:		69:10

- Recorded at Hi Fi Bar on 26 September 2003.

=== A Docunentary ===
DVD 2: A Docunentary
No.	Title	Length
1.	"The Art-Income Dialectic"
2.	"Gerard Manly Hopkins"
3.	"Acrid"
4.	"Root"
5.	"All You Don’t Know and All You Don't Need to Know"
6.	"The List of People Who TISM Want to Get Fucked"
7.	"Death Death Death Amway Amway Amway"
8.	"Death Death Death Amway Amway Amway"
9.	"Death Death Death Amway Amway Amway"
10.	"The Penis Is Mightier Than the Sword"
11.	"I'll 'Ave Ya"
12.	"Backstage"
13.	"!UOY Sevol Natas"
14.	"Give Up for Australia"
15.	"Greg! The Stop Sign!!"
16.	"All Homeboys Are Dickheads"
17.	"Defecate On My Face"
18.	"The Caveat Emptour (Won't Get Fooled Again, Again)"
19.	"Got a Root Out of It" (Live in Concert for Channel V)	3:50
20.	"Dumb 'n' Base" (Live in Concert for Channel V)	4:16
21.	"Sickie" (Live in Concert for Channel V)	3:11
22.	"TISM Explained" (TISM Interviews)	21:32
23.	"Defecate On My Face" (film clip)
24.	"Saturday Night Palsy" (film clip)
25.	"Let's Form a Company" (film clip)
26.	"Greg! The Stop Sign!!" (film clip)
27.	"(He'll Never Be An) Ol' Man River" (film clip)
28.	"I Might Be a Cunt But I'm Not a Fucking Cunt" (film clip)
29.	"Whatareya?" (film clip)	3:50
30.	"Thunderbirds" (film clip)
31.	"Famous By Fourteen" (film clip)	3:50
Total length:		57:11

== Charts ==
Chart performance for The White Albun
Chart (2004)	Peak position
Australian DVD Chart (ARIA)	14

== Release history ==
Release history and formats for The White Albun
Region	Date	Format(s)	Edition	Label	Catalogue
Australia	June 2004	CD + 2×DVD	Standard	Madman Entertainment, genre b.goode	MMA2204
Australia	2004	CD + 2×DVD	Re-issue	Madman Entertainment, genre b.goode	MMA2269
Australia	November 2004	Digital download	Re-issue	Genre B.Goode	—N/a
