= Josh Kitchen =

Australian rules footballer

Personal information
- Full name: Josh Kitchen
- Born: 15 May 1975 (age 51)
- Original team: Balwyn Juniors/Hawthorn
- Draft: Trade, 1994 AFL draft

Playing career^{1}
Years	Club	Games (Goals)
1995	St Kilda	3 (1)
- ^{1} Playing statistics correct to the end of 1995.

Josh Kitchen (born 15 May 1975) is a former Australian rules footballer who played for St Kilda in the Australian Football League (AFL) in 1995. He was traded to St Kilda from the Hawthorn Football Club prior to the 1994 AFL draft, as part of a three-way trade involving Tony Lockett and Simon Minton-Connell.

Kitchen was one of the four St Kilda players featured at the start of the 1995 music video Greg! The Stop Sign!! by Australian band TISM.
