= Defecate on My Face =

Single by TISM
- B-side: "Death Death Death"; "The Art-Income Dialectic"
- Released: June 1986
- Recorded: October 1985
- Studio: York Street
- Genre: New wave, synthpop
- Length: 4:42
- Label: Elvis
- Songwriter: TISM

TISM singles chronology
"Defecate on My Face" (1986)	"40 Years – Then Death" (1987)

"Defecate on My Face" is a song by Australian alternative rock band TISM, released in June 1986 as the band's debut single. The song is a melodic rumination on the alleged sexual relationship between Adolf Hitler and Eva Braun.

The single was released on 7" vinyl packaged in a 12" cardboard sleeve sealed on all four sides, so that one side had to be broken to hear the record. The original single has become a collector's item among fans.

== Background ==
The song, written in D minor, tells the story of Adolf Hitler and his rise through history as a great dictator. It follows his various successes throughout the Second World War, and in doing so, it reveals that his dramatic rise to power is made possible, or perhaps hampered, by his one weakness: he requires that Eva Braun defecate on his face, presumably as a fetish. When, one day she refuses, his dictatorship goes awry and several misfortunes befall him. The song reveals this to be the cause of the (real-life) failure of his plans to conquer the world, and his demise.

The idea of Hitler's coprophilia was first suggested in The Mind of Adolf Hitler, a psychological analysis prepared in 1943 for the US Office of Strategic Services (OSS) by psychoanalyst Walter C. Langer. One of the report's conclusions was that Hitler had "coprophagic tendencies or their milder manifestations" in his heterosexual relationships, and masochistically derived "sexual gratification from the act of having a woman urinate or defecate on him."

The chorus contains the lines: "There's trouble brewing in the Warsaw Pact; So hurry up Eva and move your digestive tract". The Warsaw Pact was not established until 1955, a decade after Hitler's death. Due to the song's lyrics, it was not played on radio until 1993.

The second B-side, "The Art-Income Dialectic" was recorded as a prize for winning a 3RRR battle of the bands competition. It was recorded at the Aztec Studios on 24 November 1985, alongside two other tracks: "If You Want the Toilet, You're in It" and "When You're Happy and You Know It, Kill Yourself". "If You Want the Toilet..." was released on Collected Recordings 1986-1993 in 1995, while "When You're Happy..." remained unreleased until the 2021 reissue of Form and Meaning Reach Ultimate Communion. A recording of the battle of the bands competition TISM participated in was also released on the CD reissue of FMRUC.

The record sleeve is pink, with red writing stating "THIS IS SERIOUS MUM" in all four edges, while faux biographies of the band members are written in the main field in black, with a large red "TISM" in the centre of each. If viewed from a distance, the artwork resembles a backwards swastika. The biographical text was later published separately in the book The TISM Guide to Little Aesthetics in 1990.

== Reception ==
Australian musicologist, Ian McFarlane, declared that "Defecate on My Face", "explored the sexual interplay between Adolf Hitler and Eva Braun in Nazi Germany, and it became a dance club favourite."

AllMusic's Jonathan Lewis compares TISM with United States alternative rockers, Ween, "While Ween writes songs that are happily crass, even they would hesitate to record a song called 'Defecate on My Face,' let alone release it as a single. But TISM shows no such restraint."

== Video ==
The video was filmed in 1985 and features stock footage of Nazi soldiers and several high-ranking Nazi officials inter-cut with footage of bombs dropping and aftermath of these events. One scene involves a man who looks up just as bombs are dropped from a plane, a subtle nod towards the song's theme. Also in the video are TISM dancing in front of a white screen in their trademark black balaclavas and Ku Klux Klan uniforms. One part features a TISM member with a white sheet over his head trying to eat popcorn through the sheet.

One moment in the video features a piece of card with a quote, supposedly from T. S. Eliot, which reads "Hurry Up" and a caption "To his kettle". Below it is small print that says "THIS WRITING IS FOR PEOPLE WHO SLOW DOWN THEIR VIDEOS". At two minutes into the video, two unmasked TISM members can be seen.

== Other versions ==
"Defecate on My Face" has become the most re-released TISM song, appearing on several recordings.

The song was written in 1983 and appears on the bedroom tape "Hooked on Crap" from that year. That version, featuring an entirely different music bed to the more well-known versions, would remain unreleased until 2022. The first released version was a dark, bass-driven version of the track, with an extensive scratching solo, appearing on the band's self-titled 1984 demo tape. By that time, the song had switched to using a modified version of the riff to "Macca Spits the Dummy of Life", another Hooked on Crap track, which too would remain unreleased until 2022.

The next version was a 7" single, which contained a version of "Defecate..." that would later appear on tism.bestoff. (2002) along with a remix by Machine Gun Fellatio. This version, recorded in October 1985 at York Street Studios, is performed in a style similar to the demo version but incorporating elements of Australian pub rock, featuring heavy guitars in the pre-choruses and choruses and retaining the scratching solo and was the one used for the music video.

The most well-known, a completely pub rock version, appears on their album, Great Truckin' Songs of the Renaissance (1988), with the turntable solo replaced by a Beatles sample. A country and western version was recorded for Form and Meaning Reach Ultimate Communion (1986) and re-appeared on Gentlemen, Start Your Egos (1991). That version is played in A minor as opposed to the D minor of the rock version.

Machines Against the Rage (1996) and The White Albun (2004) both included live versions, the former featuring extra guitar noodling by Tokin' Blackman. A live version appearing on the band's first VHS, Shoddy and Poor, features a keyboard solo by Eugene de la Hot Croix Bun in lieu of any samples.

In 2022, the single was reissued as a box set containing a replica of the original 7", a bonus LP containing the majority of the band's 1985 unreleased home demo Muggy Climates in My Jockettes and a CD containing the contents of both records and 10 extra versions of the title track, including the Hooked on Crap version. The release was delayed from the initially announced 22 April due to the container with the shipments of the outer box and the quad-fold 12" cover being seized by the Australian Border Force. The box set was finally released in August.

== Track listing ==
7" single (ER0072)
No.	Title	Length
1.	"Defecate on My Face"	4:49
2.	"Death Death Death"	3:05
3.	"The Art/Income Dialectic"	1:24

== Personnel ==
- Peter Minack – lead vocals
- Sean Kelly – guitar, backing vocals
- John Holt – bass, backing vocals
- Damian Cowell – drum programming, backing vocals
- Eugene Cester – keyboards, backing vocals, scratching solo
- Mark Fessey – saxophone
