= Death to Art =

Studio album by TISM
- Released: 4 October 2024
- Recorded: 2022–2024
- Studios: Empire Studios, Melbourne; TISM Mobile Recording Unit
- Length: 80:20
- Labels: genre b.goode; DRW Entertainment
- Producer: TISM

TISM chronology
The White Albun (2004)	Death to Art (2024)

Singles from Death to Art
- 1. "I've Gone Hillsong" Released: 1 December 2023; 2. "The 'C' Word" Released: 15 December 2023; 3. "Death to Art" Released: 12 July 2024; 4. "'70s Football" Released: 6 September 2024; 5. "Old School TISM" Released: 16 October 2024

Professional ratings
Review scores
Source	Rating
The Australian	4/5 stars
The Guardian	3/5 stars

Death to Art is the seventh studio album by Australian alternative rock band TISM, released on 4 October 2024 through their own label genre.b.goode and DRW Entertainment. It is the band's first full-length album in 20 years, since The White Albun in 2004. It is also their first studio album to feature Vladimir Lenin-McCartney as lead guitarist: TISM's previous lead guitarist, Tokin' Blackman, died from lung cancer in 2008, having been with the band from 1991 to the band's hiatus in 2004.

At 80 minutes and 20 seconds, it is the band's longest studio album.

The album was released in three editions: standard CD and LP editions and a unique "censored" LP mix, with early mixes of selected tracks and the words "death to art" handwritten on the cover and labels.

The album charted at number 15 on the ARIA Albums Chart. It is their sixth album to reach the top 50, and their highest charting album since Machiavelli and the Four Seasons in 1995.

== Track listing ==
Death to Art track listing Disc 1
No.	Title	Length
1.	"78 Minutes to Springvale"	0:50
2.	"Old Skool TISM"	2:59
3.	"75 Minutes to Springvale"	0:08
4.	"Death to Art"	3:21
5.	"70 Minutes to Springvale"	0:16
6.	"Cunts v Cunts" (TISM v TISM version)	6:59
7.	"64 Minutes to Springvale"	1:42
8.	"The 'C' Word"	2:50
9.	"59 Minutes to Springvale"	1:07
10.	"VFA"	2:30
11.	"I've Gone Hillsong"	3:12
12.	"Everybody Needs Somebody to Hate"	2:15
13.	"49 Minutes to Springvale"	0:44
14.	"I Can't Wait for My Generation to Die"	3:40
15.	"45 Minutes to Springvale"	0:53
16.	"Creed of Steve Bannon"	4:29
17.	"40 Minutes to Springvale"	0:30
18.	"We're Going to Springvale"	3:15
Total length:		41:51

Disc 2
No.	Title	Length
1.	"'70s Football"	3:06
2.	"Selling Drugs, Corner King St and Flinders Lane"	4:51
3.	"25 Minutes to Springvale"	1:43
4.	"Cabal of Bozos (Dedicated to Australia's Laziest Class, the Australian Business Class)"	6:00
5.	"19 Minutes to Springvale"	0:51
6.	"Cnut, the Dyslexic King"	3:12
7.	"14 Minutes to Springvale"	3:26
8.	"My Man's Band's T-Shirt"	3:34
9.	"Mein Bandkampf"	4:03
10.	"4 Minutes to Springvale"	2:41
11.	"TISM's Last Will and Testicle"	4:59
Total length:		38:30; 80:20 (total)

Notes

- "Old Skool TISM" was first recited as a diatribe at the end of TISM's 2022 warmup shows for Good Things Festival, but not at the festival shows themselves.
- "Death to Art" (then known as "Destroy All Art"), "Everybody Needs Somebody to Hate" (known only by the last three words) and the song version of "Old Skool TISM" made their live debut on 24 February 2024 at a warmup show in Frankston for the band's performance at MONA FOMA in Launceston, alongside "The 'C' Word".
- The version of "Cunts v Cunts" released on streaming and download services bleeps out the line "It's Hitler v. Stalin". "Mein Bandkampf" is also listed on those services as "Bash It Up Your Ginger".

== Charts ==
Chart performance for Death to Art
Chart (2024)	Peak position
Australian Albums (ARIA)	15
Australian Independent Albums (AIR)	2
Australian Independent Label Albums (AIR)	2
