= Bernard Derriman =

Australian animator

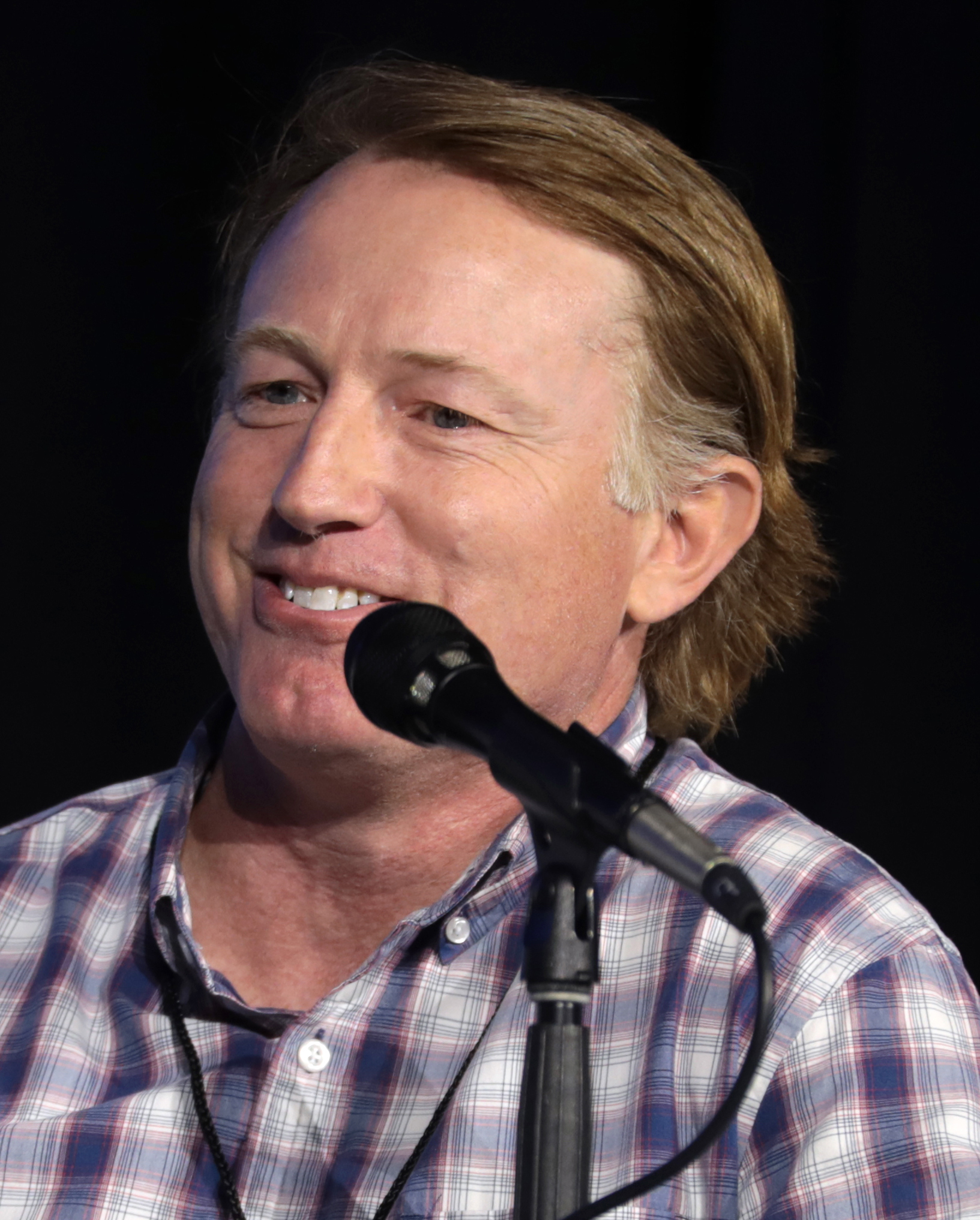
- Derriman at the 2022 WonderCon
- Born: Bernard Derriman; Australia
- Occupations: Animator; Director; Producer
- Years active: 1991–present

Bernard Derriman is an Australian animator, director, and producer. He is known for working on the animated sitcom Bob's Burgers and co-directing its animated feature film. He began his career in animation at Walt Disney Television Animation Australia in Sydney. He was an animator there until 2006, working on both television series and films.

Derriman directed an animated short based on the movie Chopper, which won Best Comedy Award at the 2001 Tropfest Short Film Festival.

Derriman went on to co-create the animated series Arj and Poopy, with US comedian Arj Barker. Their Arj and Poopy shorts have received worldwide recognition, most notably winning the internet category at the Annecy International Animated Film Festival in 2005 and 2006. The last episode produced, "Congo Windfall" was chosen in the Top Ten Best Animated Flash films by the website Cold Hard Flash. It also featured the new character to the series, Bouncy the Dog, voiced by Johnny Brennan of the Jerky Boys fame.

He directed and animated a music video for the song "Everyone Else Has Had More Sex Than Me" by the band TISM which became a viral hit. Derriman won a competition for the 50th anniversary of the Annecy International Animated Film Festival with his short film "Pop".

He was Animation Director on the PBS children's series Big Green Rabbit and won seven Regional Emmys for his work on that show. He directed "Drones", episode 6 in season 8 of Beavis and Butthead.

Derriman was a Supervising Director on the show Bob's Burgers until the tenth production cycle, when he was promoted to Producer, and co-directed The Bob's Burgers Movie with creator Loren Bouchard. He has won two Emmys for his work on Bob's Burgers.

Derriman also directed the Bob's Burgers-themed couch gag from The Simpsons episode "My Way or the Highway to Heaven" and he is a consulting producer on The Great North and Central Park.
