= Everyone Else Has Had More Sex Than Me =

Single by TISM

from the album The White Albun
- Released: October 2004
- Recorded: 2003
- Genre: Alternative rock, power pop
- Length: 3:53
- Label: genre b.goode
- Songwriters: Peter Minack; Damian Cowell; John Holt; Eugene Cester; James Paull
- Producer: TISM

TISM singles chronology
"Honk If You Love Fred Durst" (2002)	"Everyone Else Has Had More Sex Than Me" (2004)	"For Those About to Rock" (2020)

Music video
- "Everyone Else Has Had More Sex Than Me" on YouTube

"Everyone Else Has Had More Sex Than Me" is a song by the Australian alternative rock band TISM. It was the only single off The White Albun (2004). The single was not released commercially in Australia. It was, however, distributed to Australian radio stations, and signed copies were made available to fans attending the Popcorn Taxi session with the band in 2004 (hosted by John Safran).

Adrian Ringin of MediaSearch felt it was "a decent song, not the greatest song in the world, and isn’t even the greatest TISM song in the world – or this album."

TISM held a competition for the general public to create a music video for the track, which was won by Bernard Derriman. After the video became popular via the internet, 2005 saw the single's commercial release in Germany; it peaked in the country's top 100 singles chart.

== Video ==
Snapshot of the "Everyone Else Has Had More Sex Than Me" Flash animation.

Perhaps better known is the Flash animation by Bernard Derriman, which features the song. The video was chosen from a multitude of entrants in a competition. The winning entry was a cartoon featuring rabbits with numbers printed on their chests, which indicate the number of times each rabbit has had sex. The main bunny wears the number 1, hence the song. Other rabbits of various ages and appearances are shown, some with surprisingly high numbers. Most versions of the video feature a buxom female bunny wearing the number 1,718, and in the video for the Laurence Maddy remix, a male rabbit with a jaded expression and a horseshoe moustache (possibly meant to be a porn star) claims an impressive 10,419. Despite the singer's lament, one bunny is shown who has had even less sex: the rabbit who plays the keyboard solo, wearing a balaclava (as TISM did while performing) and bearing a number of 0.

At the end of the video, when a chorus of bunnies emerges, all singing the final chorus, asking "Does everybody else get that feeling?," one is presented tongue-in-cheek with the number 3.5 on his chest. This is followed by scenes of the main rabbit posing in suggestive or comedic positions, ending with the rabbit in tears.

Derriman's flash animation was nominated in the Music Video category at the Annecy International Animated Film Festival for 2005.

== Track listing ==
Sony BMG (8287669264 2)
No.	Title	Length
1.	"Everyone Else Has Had More Sex Than Me" (European radio edit)	3:02
2.	"Everyone Else Has Had More Sex Than Me" (album version)	3:53
3.	"Everyone Else Has Had More Sex Than Me" (Laurence Maddy remix / Australian radio version)	3:11

== Charts ==
Chart performance for "Everyone Else Has Had More Sex Than Me"
Chart (2005)	Peak position
Germany (GfK)	63

== Release history ==
Release history for "Everyone Else Has Had More Sex Than Me"
Region	Date	Format(s)	Edition	Label	Catalogue
Australia	October 2004	Radio single	Standard	Madman/genre b.goode	—N/a
Germany	May 2005	CD}	Maxi single	Epic/Sony BMG Music Entertainment	8287669264 2
