= Shut Up – The Footy's on the Radio =

Single by TISM
- Released: June 1997
- Recorded: March 1997
- Genre: Alternative rock
- Length: 2:40
- Songwriter: TISM

TISM singles chronology
| "Garbage" (1996) | "Shut Up – The Footy's on the Radio" (1997) | "Yob" (1997) |

"Shut Up – The Footy's on the Radio" is a song by Australian Alternative rock band, TISM. It was written as an entrant for a Triple M football competition in 1997, which it won. Its prize was to be the theme music for Triple M's AFL coverage. The song peaked at number 90 on the ARIA Charts.

The song was rerecorded and re-released in March 2010 and used in Triple M's AFL coverage for the 2010 season.

On 17 September 2021, the extended B-side remixes were released on the group's remix album Collected Remixes, followed by the radio edit on the 2022 best of Collected Versus. This is the first time the song has been made available beyond its parent CD single.

== Reception ==
By some, the single was described simply as "commercial opportunism".

Heard magazine's reviewer rated the track as 8.5 out of 10, with the explanation "The masked men return with a pretty cool commercial hit... the guys go a long way to get every listener into the football spirit by getting the guitars & general 'yob' atmosphere happening." However, they felt that "There doesn't really seem to be much point to having three different [mix] versions to me, when we could have had one of their album out-takes or something similar."

== Track listing ==
CD single (G008)

1. "Shut Up – The Footy's on the Radio" (Radio edit) – 2:40
2. "Shut Up – The Footy's on the Radio" (extended mix) – 3:05
3. "Shut Up – The Footy's on the Radio" (Triple M edit) – 3:02

== Charts ==
Chart performance for "Shut Up – The Footy's on the Radio"
| Chart (1997) | Peak position |
|---|---|
| Australia (ARIA) | 90 |
