= Hot Dogma =

Album by TISM

Studio album by TISM
- Released: 1 October 1990
- Recorded: April–July 1990 ("I Don't Want TISM..." and "I'll 'Ave Ya" recorded May 1989)
- Studios: Platinum Studios, Sing Sing Studios
- Genre: Alternative rock
- Length: 50:38; 70:41 (CD/MC versions)
- Label: Phonogram/PolyGram
- Producers: Peter Blyton and Laurence Maddy

TISM chronology
Great Truckin' Songs of the Renaissance (1988)	Hot Dogma (1990)	Gentlemen, Start Your Egos (1991)

Singles from Hot Dogma
- 1. "I Don't Want TISM, I Want a Girlfriend" Released: 11 December 1989; 2. "The History of Western Civilisation" Released: 17 September 1990; 3. "Let's Form a Company" Released: 25 February 1991

Hot Dogma is the second studio album by the Australian alternative rock band TISM. It was released on 1 October 1990 and peaked at number 86 on the ARIA Charts. The title comes from a joining of the two phrases hot dog, a food, and dogma, a specific religious belief. An additional disc, Hot Dogma - The Interview Disc was added to initial sales copies and contains live responses by TISM to an unheard DJ's questions.

On 18 November 2024, the album was reissued on CD and (for the first time) double LP, containing the full 24-song tracklist.

== Reception ==
In a review of TISM's sixth studio album The White Albun, Anton S Trees of FasterLouder compared it to Hot Dogma, where the latter is "filled with moments of introspection and reflection on the nature of self, existence and mortality – TISM examine the value of life. Most prominent amongst the examinations of mortality and the cyclical nature of existence is 'Life Kills'."

Steve Bell of theMusic.com.au website noticed it "quickly became a fan favourite but didn't set the world on fire commercially nor bother the charts, so TISM were soon unceremoniously dumped by Phonogram during 1991 and found themselves homeless."

== Cover and liner notes ==
The cover of the album features what appear to be Chinese Red Guards carrying a large banner with “TISM” written across it and carrying what, on first look, appears to be Mao Zedong's Little Red Book, but is on closer inspection The TISM Guide To Little Aesthetics. The artwork closely resembled posters of the time of Mao's reign.

The Chinese on the cover (Chinese: 无产阶级革命派在迪思想的伟大红旗下联合起来!) translates into "The unification of the proletariat under the banner of TISM".

The back cover of the album has the track lists in Chinese, however the band have repeatedly claimed that the Asian division of Polygram released a version with the track titles in English. The titles are listed in English in the liner notes.

On the original 1990 CD release, the Chinese text wrapped around the cover art, as on the LP, but the 2024 reissue placed the entire text on the front of the digipak. The original LP release featured an inner sleeve with the liner notes, however this was changed to a gatefold sleeve on the reissue, with it instead containing inner sleeves with full lyrics to the album.

== Track listings ==
=== Original LP version ===
Synopsis: Act One
No.	Title	Length
1.	"The TISM Boat Hire Offer"	2:54
2.	"ExistentialTISM"	3:31
3.	"While My Catarrh Gently Weeps"	5:18
4.	"They Shoot Heroin, Don't They?"	2:49
5.	"Kevin Borich Expressionism Part 1"	0:23
6.	"Whinge Rock"	2:34
7.	"(I'm Gonna Sit Right Down and) Whittle Away My Furniture"	2:13
8.	"The TISM Finance Plan Offer"	2:29
9.	"Leo's Toltoy"	4:04

Synopsis: Act Two
No.	Title	Length
10.	"The History of Western Civilisation"	3:00
11.	"Kevin Borich Expressionism Part 2"	0:22
12.	"My Generation"	4:06
13.	"Kevin Borich Expressionism Part 4"	0:25
14.	"Let's Club It to Death"	2:46
15.	"Let's Form a Company"	4:07
16.	"Life Kills"	5:53
17.	"Pus of the Dead"	2:31
18.	"It's Novel! It's Unique!! It's Shithouse!!!"	1:46

=== CD, cassette and reissue LP versions ===
Synopsis: Act One
No.	Title	Length
1.	"The TISM Boat Hire Offer"	2:54
2.	"ExistentialTISM"	3:31
3.	"While My Catarrh Gently Weeps"	5:18
4.	"They Shoot Heroin, Don't They?"	2:49
5.	"Dazed And Confucious"	5:33
6.	"Kevin Borich Expressionism Part 1"	0:23
7.	"I'll 'Ave Ya"	2:14
8.	"Whinge Rock"	2:34
9.	"The TISM Nightsoil Cart And Horse Blues"	2:53
10.	"I'm Gonna Sit Right Down and Whittle Away My Furniture"	2:13
11.	"The TISM Finance Plan Offer"	2:29
12.	"Leo's Toltoy"	4:04

Synopsis: Act Two
No.	Title	Length
13.	"The History of Western Civilisation"	3:00
14.	"Kevin Borich Expressionism Part 2"	0:22
15.	"My Generation"	3:20
16.	"I Don't Want TISM, I Want a Girlfriend"	4:06
17.	"Kevin Borich Expressionism Part 4"	0:25
18.	"Get Thee in My Behind, Satan"	3:02
19.	"We Are the Champignons"	2:13
20.	"Let's Club It to Death"	2:46
21.	"Let's Form a Company"	4:07
22.	"Life Kills"	3:35
23.	Untitled (unlisted Life Kills/Pus of the Dead segue)	2:15
24.	"Pus of the Dead"	2:34
25.	"It's Novel! It's Unique! It's Shithouse!"	1:46

Digital bonus tracks (2009)
No.	Title	Length
26.	"The Ball That Doesn't Turn, but Goes Straight on with the Arm"	1:44
27.	"The TISM Finance Plan Offer" (from the rehearsal tapes)	2:46
28.	"Put Your Dog to Sleep" (from the rehearsal tapes)	3:16
29.	"Naked Movie Star"	2:36
30.	"I'm Gonna Sit Right Down and Whittle Away My Furniture" (from the rehearsal tapes)	2:10

The unlisted segue and "Life Kills" are indexed as one 5:52-long track on the iTunes and Spotify releases.

=== Hot Dogma – The Interview Disc ===
LP copies of Hot Dogma were bundled with a pack-in 7" single, containing a humorous open-ended interview with TISM and blank spaces for a DJ to insert the questions. Both sides contain the same interview.

==== Questions ====
- "Your new album is on PolyGram, will you change now that you're signed to a major label?"
- "How did you guys come to be in a band?"
- "Why don't you ever show your face?"
- "Your live shows have a reputation for being pretty wild affairs. Do you deliberately set out to work up your audience?"
- "What kind of people come to your shows?"
- "Your new album Hot Dogma is pretty amazing - over an hour of music, all kinds of different styles; what can you tell us about it?"
- "OK, so you obviously prefer not to give much away in interviews. Why is that?"
- "I am a self-respecting DJ..."
- "I do think I have a feel for what's going down..."
- "I do have a certain duty towards my audience..."
- "YES!"

The last four tracks on the disc are questions from TISM to the DJ.

== Hot Dogma (Sing Sing Sessions) ==
Hot Dogma (Sing Sing Sessions)

Demo album by TISM
- Released: 18 August 2023
- Recorded: 17–18 March 1990
- Studio: Sing Sing Studios
- Genre: Alternative rock
- Length: 76:27
- Label: genre b.goode
- Producer: TISM

On 17 and 18 March 1990, TISM recorded demos for what eventually became Hot Dogma at Sing Sing Studios. Six tracks from the session were released in 1995 on Collected Recordings 1986-1993, while the whole set of demos was eventually released on 18 August 2023, as part of the ongoing reissue campaign of TISM's discography, and hit #14 on the ARIA Australian Artist charts.

Notable inclusions are the first known studio recording of "Opium is the Religion of the Masses", a song previously only known from live recordings from the Great Truckin' Songs of the Renaissance era, and "Greece is Still Greece", which provided the backing music for the album version of "The TISM Finance Plan Offer", as well as "Too Cool for School, Too Stupid for Life", a song that had been performed several times by TISM in 1989 but never used on an album.

=== Tracklist ===
1. Life Kills
2. Wham Bam Thank You Imam*
3. ExistentialTISM
4. Greece is Still Greece
5. The TISM Finance Plan Offer*
6. Let's Form a Company
7. Opium is the Religion of the Masses
8. Put Your Dog to Sleep*
9. The Ball That Doesn't Turn, but Goes Straight On With the Arm
10. (I'm Gonna Sit Right Down and) Whittle Away My Furniture
11. My Generation
12. Dazed and Confucius
13. Naked Movie Star
14. In Defence of Poetry*
15. The TISM Nightsoil Cart and Horse Blues
16. While My Catarrh Gently Weeps
17. Too Cool for School / All You Don't Know and All You Don't Need to Know
18. Get Thee in My Behind, Satan
19. The Law of Repulsion After Orgasm*
20. They Shoot Heroin, Don't They?
21. Let's Club It to Death
22. We Are the Champignons
23. Kevin Borich Expressionism*
24. The TISM Boat Hire Offer
25. Whinge Rock
- previously released

== Charts ==
Chart (1990)	Peak position
Australian Albums (ARIA)	86

== Release history ==
Release history and formats for Hot Dogma
Region	Date	Format(s)	Edition	Label	Catalogue
Australia	October 1990	CD; Cassette; LP	Standard	Phonogram Records	846901-1/2/4
Australia	1994	CD; Cassette; LP	Re-issue	Phonogram Records	846 901–2
Australia	October 2009	digital download	Re-issue	Genre B.Goode	—N/a
Australia	November 2024	CD; LP	Re-issue	Genre B.Goode	GBG0048/GBG0049
