= Greg! The Stop Sign!! =

Single by TISM

from the album Machiavelli and the Four Seasons
- B-side: "Strictly Loungeroom"; "There's More Men in Children Than Wisdom Knows"
- Released: August 1995
- Recorded: September 1994
- Studio: Platinum Studios
- Genre: Alternative rock
- Length: 3:28
- Label: genre b.goode
- Songwriters: TISM (Peter Minack, Damian Cowell, John Holt, Eugene Cester, James Paull)
- Producer: Lawrence Maddy

TISM singles chronology
"(He'll Never Be An) Ol' Man River" (1995)	"Greg! The Stop Sign!!" (1995)	"Garbage" (1996)

"Greg! The Stop Sign!!" is a song by Australian alternative rock band TISM. It was released in August 1995 as the third single from the album Machiavelli and the Four Seasons (1995).

The song peaked at number 59 on the ARIA chart and polled at number 10 in the Triple J Hottest 100, 1995.

At the ARIA Music Awards of 1996, the song was nominated for the ARIA Award for Best Independent Release.

The song is based on a series of speeding advertisements released by the TAC (Victorian road and safety authority), who are mentioned in the song. The bridge is recycled from an earlier song called "Consumption Tax", which was recorded during The Beasts of Suburban sessions in 1992 and released on Collected Recordings 1986-1993 in 1995. The solo is a variation on the intro riff from The Shadows' composition "FBI".

In December 2022, a limited-edition 12-inch single was released, containing early versions of the song dating back to January 1994 as well as its precursor track "Consumption Tax". The original versions from early 1994 used the riff from "The Ballad of Paul Keating", a song that had been performed on The Beasts of Suburban tour in 1992.

== Video ==
The "famous" scene in the video clip of a dog eating vomit.

The video for the song was directed by Mark Hartley. It begins with four players of the St Kilda Football Club exercising in slow motion (Shane Wakelin, Chris Hemley, Justin Peckett and Josh Kitchen) before then moving into the club's locker room where TISM is seen dancing and singing. Seen on the lockers are the names of famous players, and the walls feature various sporting success cliches (including the prominent "Your [sic] a professional. 'Keep it simple ") The scene shifts to a football field where the band are singing and dancing on the turf.

Eventually the video turns to a group of teenagers partying in a house. The camera moves into the house to see them all drinking and enjoying themselves. As the camera moves into the back room, a teenage girl is seen vomiting on the floor, overlooked by a member of TISM. The video then turns into two scenes from black and white fictional films ("There is more men in children than wisdom knows" and "Le Rape De Mururoa") which are given contrasting "stars" by Margaret and David, with both scenes starring a member of TISM. These two film scenes are broken by more footage of TISM in the locker room. Back in the house one of the most notorious and well known scenes of the video shows a dog eating the vomit from earlier. The video ends as a couple outside the house argue while once again a member of TISM watches on.

Throughout the video, the members of TISM are dressed in black uniforms with high shoulder pads and with faces covered by a Balaclava mask, giving them a strange and threatening visage. In the scenes where members of TISM are in the film clips or at the party, they are seemingly invisible to the people around them, able to move and interact with the music video audience, but seemingly ghostlike to the woman in the clips or the teenagers at the party.

== Reception ==
Jonathan Lewis from AllMusic called the song a "highlight of the disc".

Adam Woolcock from The Guardian has called it "a metaphor for our collective mortality" and "thrillingly bizarre".

== Track list ==
CD single (G004)

1. "Greg! The Stop Sign!!" - 3:29
2. "Strictly Loungeroom" - 4:07
3. "There's More Men in Children Than Wisdom Knows" - 3:36

== Personnel ==
- Ron Hitler-Barassi - lead vocals
- Tokin’ Blackman - guitar, backing vocals
- Jock Cheese - bass, backing vocals
- Humphrey B. Flaubert - drums, backing vocals, lead vocals (bridge)
- Eugene De La Hot Croix Bun - keyboards, backing vocals

== Charts ==
Chart (1995)	Peak position
Australia (ARIA)	59
