= De RigueurMortis =

Studio album by TISM
- Released: 29 October 2001
- Recorded: August 2000–July 2001
- Genre: Alternative rock
- Length: 71:34
- Label: genre b.goode, Festival Mushroom Records
- Producer: TISM

TISM chronology
www.tism.wanker.com (1998)	De RigueurMortis (2001)	tism.bestoff. (2002)

Singles from De RigueurMortis
- 1. "Honk If You Love Fred Durst" Released: 2001

Professional ratings
Review scores
Source	Rating
Sydney Star Observer	3.5/5 stars

De RigueurMortis (stylised as De RigueurMortis) is the fifth studio album by Australian alternative-rock group TISM, released in October 2001. The album peaked at number 24 on the ARIA Charts.

The title is taken from a line in the song "Come Back DJ, Your Record is Scratched". The album cover is a tribute to the fantasy-themed artwork of Roger Dean, famous for his work with art rock bands such as Yes and Uriah Heep. The CD label is designed after the original label Mushroom used on its LPs between 1973 and c. 1975.

Initial copies of this release, dubbed the "Connoisseur's Edition" (a play on words of "collector's edition"), included a bonus CD titled 2Pot Screama, a 40-minute "rock opera in one act" which TISM described as "West Side Story with Tourette's syndrome".

The censored name in the final track, 'BFW', is Kylie Minogue. At the time of the album's release, both TISM and Minogue were label mates on Festival Mushroom Records. The track was censored at the record company's insistence.

== Track listing ==
De RigueurMortis
No.	Title	Length
1.	"Unfair (Extract)"	0:55
2.	"If You're Not Famous at Fourteen, You're Finished"	2:53
3.	"Five Yards"	3:14
4.	"Fielding at Long-On, Pt. 1"	0:43
5.	"Ten Points for a Razor Scooter"	3:11
6.	"Fielding at Long-On, Pt. 2"	0:42
7.	"Thou Shalt Not Britney Spear"	3:18
8.	"Would the Last Person to Leave Please Turn Out the Enlightenment?"	2:42
9.	"The Young Vandal Extemporizes"	0:42
10.	"Moby-Dick Head" (Recorded using binaural recording techniques.)	0:35
11.	"Schoolies Week"	3:42
12.	"The Horse, Not the Horseshit"	0:51
13.	"Geniuses Are Turds (Extract)"	0:23
14.	"I Abhor This Senseless Waste of Violence (Extract)"	0:36
15.	"Come Back DJ, Your Record is Scratched"	5:06
16.	"You're a Long Way from Home, Pt. 1"	1:21
17.	"Boot Party"	4:03
18.	"To Whom It May Concern"	3:09
19.	"Intermission"	3:05
20.	"Channel Turd"	2:55
21.	"Fatboy Slim Dusty"	3:19
22.	"You're a Long Way from Home, Pt. 2"	1:13
23.	"Ex Malcolm X (Extract)"	0:15
24.	"Honk If You Love Fred Durst"	3:33
25.	"You're a Long Way from Home, Pt. 3"	1:12
26.	"X-Treme Sports Can Kiss My Arse"	3:27
27.	"The Man from Popular Culture Came Round"	1:39
28.	"Fourteen Years in Rowville"	3:09
29.	"Yet Another Hinch Diatribe"	0:58
30.	"Fielding at Long-On, Pt. 3"	0:42
31.	"BFW"	7:14

digital re-release bonus tracks
No.	Title	Length
32.	"Out, Freak" (Previously unreleased, musically identical to Honk If You Love Fred Durst)	3:07
33.	"Just Muckin' Around" (Previously unreleased)	2:39
34.	"Got a Root Out of It" (Previously unreleased)	2:27
35.	"Won't Get Fooled Again, Again" (Previously released on Honk If You Love Fred Durst single, this version previously unreleased)	2:46
36.	"Money Shot" (Previously unreleased)	4:18
37.	"There's No Bigger Knob Than a Private School Knob" (Previously unreleased)	3:52
38.	"TISM Club Song (Live at the Laundry, Triple R, Post-match, 15 November 2001)" (Previously unreleased, broadcast on Triple R)	2:08
39.	"2Pot Screama" (Previously released as bonus disc on original copies of De RigueurMortis)	40:40

=== 2Pot Screama ===
No.	Title	Length
1.	"2Pot Screama - A Rock Opera in One Act"	40:40

"Out, Freak", an early version of the music that would later be used for "Honk if You Love Fred Durst" with lyrics derived from a diatribe about Marilyn Manson, would later be included on Reclink Community Cup, Vol. 1, a compilation of songs by artists that have performed at previous Community Cup events, in 2025.

== Charts ==
Chart (2001)	Peak position
Australian Albums (ARIA)	24

== Release history ==
Release history and formats for De RigueurMortis
Region	Date	Format(s)	Edition	Label	Catalogue
Australia	October 2001	CD	Standard	genre b.goode	TISM007
Australia	October 2001	2×CD	De Rigueurmortis Connoisseur's Edition	genre b.goode	TISM006
Australia	October 2009	Re-issue	Digital download	genre b.goode	—N/a
