= Great Truckin' Songs of the Renaissance =

Studio album by TISM
- Released: 26 September 1988
- Recorded: Platinum Studios May 1987, January–March 1988; Trees Studios, Melbourne 3RRR Studios, Electric Leakland Premises; The Venue, St. Kilda 5 February 1988; Trade Union Club, Sydney 11–12 December 1987
- Genre: Alternative rock
- Length: 69:48
- Label: Elvis • Musicland
- Producer: TISM

TISM chronology
Form and Meaning reach Ultimate Communion (1986)	Great Truckin' Songs of the Renaissance (1988)	Hot Dogma (1990)

Singles from Great Truckin' Songs of the Renaissance
- 1. "40 Years – Then Death" Released: 23 September 1987; 2. "The Ballad of John Bonham's Coke Roadie" Released: May 1988; 3. "I'm Interested in Apathy" Released: September 1988; 4. "Saturday Night Palsy" Released: January 1989; 5. "Martin Scorsese Is Really Quite a Jovial Fellow" Released: June 1989

Great Truckin' Songs of the Renaissance is the debut album by the Australian band TISM, released on 26 September 1988 by Elvis Records and Musicland Independent Distributors. The album peaked at No. 48 on the ARIA Charts in October 1988.

The vinyl version has a different vocal mix on the track, "Saturday Night Palsy", including an alternate line of lyrics, with the line "I want to shoot heroin through the eye" replaced by "I want to shove a red-hot poker through the eye" on the CD.

The title is derived from the band's first album-length recording, which was recorded in December 1982, shortly after the group's formation.

In March 2022, LP and CD reissues were announced, with the CD containing a bonus album with 40 minutes of unreleased content. A cassette reissue, featuring the bonus content and the LP version of the cover art on cassette for the first time, had been released that February. The CD was released that May, with the LP following in August due to delays involving the cover art.

== Singles ==
- "40 Years – Then Death" was released in September 1987 as the album's lead single. The song details an early-twenties male's despondent view of his remaining sex life: 40 more years of "living" then "death". In 2024, the song was rewritten with new lyrics and retitled "14 Years - Then Death".
- "The Ballad of John Bonham's Coke Roadie" was released in May 1988. The song deals with the assistant to Led Zeppelin drummer, John Bonham, whose job was to procure cocaine for the musician. Throughout the song the musician compares his life to that of an ordinary person whose life is racked with misery and spousal unfaithfulness, contrasted with that of the roadie, whose only concern is the acquisition of cocaine.
- "I'm Interested in Apathy" was released in September 1988 as the album's third single. At the ARIA Music Awards of 1989, the song won ARIA Award for Best Independent Release.
- "Saturday Night Palsy" was released in January 1989 as the fourth single. The song focuses on a man who has the inability to decide on matters, particularly, in which manner to harm himself. The song continues through with various opposing scenarios offered by the man, but at the end nothing has been resolved. A music video was directed by Peter Bain-Hog and featured a handsome man spending his day getting ready to go out dancing. Eventually he finds himself outside of a TISM concert and denied entry, at the end of the video, he is so dejected by the experience that he commits suicide by hanging himself in a nearby alley. TISM performed the song Australian variety TV show, Hey Hey It's Saturday.
- "Martin Scorsese Is Really Quite a Jovial Fellow" was released in June 1989 as the album's fifth and final single. The song deals with the dark and often depressing nature of Scorsese's subjects and the way that a normally happy or perky person would also be quite depressed after watching one of his films.

== Reception ==
Professional ratings
Review scores
Source	Rating
AllMusic	4.5/5 stars

The Age's Shaun Carney, in September 1988, described Great Truckin' Songs of the Renaissance as "a fine piece of work. Clever clever [sic] they might be on occasions, but if a few more bands applied even half the humor, social observation and melodic intervention that TISM seems to simply toss off, the world would be a, um, groovier place."

Jonathan Lewis of AllMusic rated the album as four-and-a-half stars out of five, he explained "Completely tasteless and musically mediocre, the album was nonetheless fresh, witty, and extremely funny. The album is more or less standard guitar rock, but it is the song lyrics that make this album great."

In December 2004 FasterLouder's Kathryn Kernohan felt the group had "always written simple, direct pop songs... [their] basic structure has remained the same – danceable guitar and keyboard lines coupled with catchy choruses. The band’s ability to write a ridiculously good pop song is second-to-none and this is no better exemplified than in Great Truckin’ Songs opening tracks." She noticed that "The second record of the double-vinyl set (it's not as much fun on CD, is it?) contains various odds and ends, including snippets of a Triple R interview in which the band rode into the studio on lawnmowers."

In 2021, the album was ranked #102 on Rolling Stone's 200 Greatest Australian Albums of All Time, with Tyler Jenke describing the album as "a masterful celebration of every facet that made them a beloved—and dangerous—band. Packing the first half with 12 tracks (five of which would be issued as singles), TISM showcased their musical and lyrical prowess, delivering powerful and accomplished compositions filled with the sharp, biting lyrics which would become their trademark", whilst the second half of the album "illustrate their wilder side, with live recordings, early material, and media appearances complementing the traditional collection of standard tracks." He concluded his writing saying "It’s a bold move to burst onto the scene with such an ambitious and all-encompassing record, but if anyone could make it work, it was TISM."

== Track listing ==
Great Truckin' Songs of the Renaissance track listing
No.	Title	Length
1.	"I'm Interested in Apathy"	2:55
2.	"Saturday Night Palsy"	3:21
3.	"The Mystery of the Artist Explained"	3:09
4.	"If You're Creative, Get Stuffed"	3:01
5.	"40 Years – Then Death"	4:18
6.	"Anarchy Means Crossing When It Says "Don't Walk""	1:31
7.	"The Ballad of John Bonham's Coke Roadie"	2:37
8.	"Choose Bad Smack"	3:00
9.	"The Fosters Car Park Boogie"	2:37
10.	"Martin Scorsese Is Really Quite a Jovial Fellow"	3:01
11.	"I Drive a Truck"	2:12
12.	"Defecate on My Face"	4:42

This Record Isn't as Good as the Other One / Disc 2
No.	Title	Length
13.	"Kill Americans"	2:16
14.	"Volare"	0:58
15.	"The Penis Is Mightier than the Sword"	2:17
16.	"Slave to the Economist"	0:52
17.	"I Shit Me"	2:47
18.	"Doug Parkinson Sings Christie Allen"	0:55
19.	"Gimme Gimme Nervous Breakdown"	2:31
20.	"The Ballad of the Semitic Nazi"	0:39
21.	"And the Ass Said to the Angel: "Wanna Play Kick-to-Kick"?"	3:59
22.	"The Mordialloc Road Duplicator"	3:41
23.	"Jack Elliot's Turf Whinge"	1:12
24.	"Ezra Pound-Axe King"	1:35
25.	"Johnny to B. or Not to B. Goode"	0:26
26.	"Morrison Hostel"	7:48
27.	Untitled (titled on online releases as "The Ted Commandments")	1:08

iTunes bonus tracks (2009)
No.	Title	Length
28.	"The Back Upon Which Jezza Jumped" (demo tape version)	4:18
29.	"Get Thee in My Behind, Satan" (live at the Corner Hotel, 30 May 1988)	3:14
30.	"Babies Bite Back" (ditto)	3:16
31.	"(I Think I've Got) Mick Jagger Worked Out" (ditto)	3:03
32.	"ExistentialTISM"	3:38
33.	"Opium Is the Religion of the Masses"	5:34

Cassette and CD bonus tracks (2022)
No.	Title	Length
28.	"The List of People Who TISM Think Are Fucked in the Head"
29.	"Saturday Night Palsy" (original album version)
30.	"The "B" Attitudes" (live diatribe)
31.	"All You Don't Know and All You Don't Need to Know" (previously unreleased studio recording)
32.	"Ezra Pound – Axe King" (demo version)
33.	"Jack Elliot's Turf Whinge" (different excerpt from the full recording to the one on the album)
34.	"Get Thee in My Behind, Satan" (live at the Corner Hotel, 30 May 1988)
35.	"(I Can't Get No) Ariel Sharon" (excerpt; lyrics were previously published to TISM's old website)
36.	"A Tale of Two Faeces" (previously released on Collected Recordings 1986–1993)
37.	"Martin Scorsese is Really Quite a Jovial Fellow" (live)
38.	"I Drive a Truck" (demo)
39.	"Morrison Hostel" (recorded live at the Prince of Wales, 26 September 2002; previously unreleased)
40.	"Johnny to B. or Not to B. Goode" (full version; previously unreleased)
41.	"Defecate on My Face" (live)

The bonus tracks on the 2022 release are broken up with documentary-style narration and radio advertisements for concerts.

== Personnel ==
- Ron Hitler-Barassi (Peter Minack) – lead vocals
- Leek Van Vlalen (Sean Kelly) – guitar, backing vocals
- Eugene de la Hot Croix Bun (Eugene Cester) – keyboards, lead vocals, backing vocals
- Jon St. Peenis (Mark Fessey) – saxophone, backing vocals
- Les Miserables (Andrew Miglietti) – backing vocals, lead vocals on "The Fosters Car Park Boogie"
- Jock Cheese (John Holt) – bass, backing vocals
- Humphrey B. Flaubert (Damian Cowell) – lead vocals, drum programming, drums, backing vocals

== Charts ==
Chart performance for Great Truckin' Songs of the Renaissance
Chart (1988)	Peak position
Australian Albums (ARIA)	48

== Release history ==
Release history and formats for Great Truckin' Songs of the Renaissance
Region	Date	Format(s)	Edition	Label	Catalogue
Australia	26 September 1988	CD; Cassette; 2×LP	Standard	Elvis / Musicland	ER1206 / MUS CD 2001 / MUS LP 2001
Australia	1991	CD; Cassette	Re-issue	Shock	SHOCK CD 0011
Australia	2001	CD	Re-issue	Genre B.Goode / Festival Mushroom Records	TISM003
Australia	October 2009	Digital download	Re-issue	Genre B.Goode	—N/a
Australia	April 2022 (Note: Cassette release February 2022. LP release delayed to August 2022 due to quarantine problems involving the gatefold sleeves.)	CD; Cassette; 2×LP	Re-issue	Genre B. Goode / David Roy Williams Entertainment	GBG0021 (LP) / GBG0022 (CD) / GBG0023 (MC)
