= Machiavelli and the Four Seasons =

Studio album by TISM
- Released: 4 May 1995
- Recorded: September 1994 ("Jung Talent Time" and "Aussiemandias" recorded December 1992-September 1993)
- Studio: Platinum Studios ("JTT" and "Aussiemandias" recorded at Metropolis Studios)
- Genre: Alternative rock, alternative dance
- Length: 48:12
- Label: genre b.goode
- Producer: TISM

TISM chronology
Australia The Lucky Cunt (1993)	Machiavelli and the Four Seasons (1995)	Machines Against the Rage (1996)

Singles from Machiavelli and the Four Seasons
- 1. "Jung Talent Time" Released: February 1995; 2. "(He'll Never Be An) Ol' Man River" Released: June 1995; 3. "Greg! The Stop Sign!!" Released: August 1995; 4. "Garbage" Released: 15 January 1996

Machiavelli and the Four Seasons is the third studio album by the Australian rock group TISM (This Is Serious Mum). It was released on 4 May 1995.

== Background and release ==
TISM worked on what would become their next album at Metropolis Audio between December 1992 and September 1993 with various producers, including Tony Cohen, Laurence Maddy and Paul McKercher. Tracks known from these sessions include "Jung Talent Time", "Aussiemandias", "Abscess Makes the Heart Grow Fonder", "Australia - The World's Suburb", "The Ballad of Paul Keating" and "State Schools are Great Schools". The group became dissatisfied with the hard rock sound they had cultivated with Cohen and realised after playing alongside Soundgarden on the Big Day Out in January 1994 that they did not want to be associated with grunge, which was at the height of its popularity at the time. The group abandoned work on the album and started recording new demos in a techno-influenced alternative dance style after returning from the Big Day Out.

In September 1994, the group recorded Machiavelli and the Four Seasons at Platinum Studios. The final track list included "Jung Talent Time" and "Aussiemandias" from the September 1993 sessions. The chorus to "How Do I Love Thee" is taken from the end of the second movement of "Opium is the Religion of the Masses", a song written by TISM in 1983 and played during the Great Truckin' Songs of the Renaissance tour in 1988.

A song entitled "The Last Soviet Star", recorded in December 1992 and also known as "Russia", was intended to be the last song on the album, but was removed for due to the song's chorus, which was seen to be similar to "Back in the USSR" by The Beatles. This was done in order to avoid potential legal issues with the Beatles. It remained unreleased until 2009, when an edited version was released as an iTunes bonus, with a re-recorded chorus sung by Humphrey B. Flaubert. The original version, however, was uploaded to an old version of the TISM website, appeared on promotional pressings released in late 1994, and is known to have been played during TISM's set at the 1993 Big Day Out, at Melbourne Showgrounds (a diatribe recited at this concert appeared on Australia the Lucky Cunt). It would later see wide release for the first time as a hidden track on the 2023 CD reissue.

The title is a composite phrase of doo wop group Frankie Valli and the Four Seasons and thinker Niccolò Machiavelli. The cover of the album is a picture of The Hollywood Argyles.

On 26 August 2024, music journalist and known TISM fan Tyler Jenke announced a book in the 33 1/3 series about the album, which was released on 1 May 2025. 1 June also saw the announcement of a 30th-anniversary five-LP boxset for release on 4 July, containing the original album, its B-sides, the diatribes from Gold! Gold! Gold! and unreleased demo recordings dating back to January-August 1994. On 10 November that year, TISM announced an exclusive performance of the album at the Sydney Opera House on 10 April 2026. A second show was scheduled for 12 April, after paying Sydney Opera House members were able to buy tickets to the 10 April event before the official presale date.

== Singles ==
- "Jung Talent Time" was released in February 1995 as the album's lead single.
- "(He'll Never Be An) Ol' Man River" was released in June 1995. The album peaked at number 23 on the ARIA Charts.)
- "Greg! The Stop Sign!!" was released in August 1995. The song peaked at number 59 on the ARIA Charts and was nominated for an ARIA Award at the ARIA Music Awards of 1996.
- "Garbage" was released in January 1996
- "All Homeboys Are Dickheads" was pressed up and prepared for sale, but for reasons unknown, prior to shipping, TISM ordered that the single be deleted. Copies of the single did make their way into the hands of TISM fans. It was also released as a promo with Machines Against the Rage.

== Reception ==
Professional ratings
Review scores
Source	Rating
AllMusic	4/5 stars

The album was a commercial success, peaking at number 8 on the ARIA Charts and was certified Gold in 1996. To celebrate Machiavelli going "gold", it was re-released with a bonus disc in January 1996. The album was re-released again in December 1996 with a live album.

At the ARIA Music Awards of 1995, the album won the ARIA Award for Best Independent Release. Three of its songs reached Triple J Hottest 100, 1995, two of them in the top 10.

Jonathan Lewis from AllMusic said TISM "had generated a strong cult following during the 14 years of their existence prior to the release of this album, but commercial success had proved elusive.. but for Machiavelli and the Four Seasons, the band chose to embrace dance music and the resulting commercial success this album enjoyed came as a shock, at least to the band, if to no one else." Lewis opined the album "sees TISM at their wittiest since Great Truckin' Songs of the Renaissance" adding "Their lyrics are smart and their use of musical trends extremely clever... Funny, clever, and just tasteless enough to make it interesting, Machiavelli and the Four Seasons was easily the best TISM album of the '90s."

In 2021, the album was ranked #74 on Rolling Stone's 200 Greatest Australian Albums of All Time, with Tyler Jenke stating the album was "another musical evolution for the group, combining the whip-smart social satire they employed within their lyrics and pairing it with compositions that coupled commercial appeal with stellar musicianship and artistry" and concluding his writing saying the band "had crafted one of the decade’s best and most memorable albums, and their success and recognition was truly deserved.

On January 10, 2023, Paul Simpson highlighted the album as one of AllMusic's Staff Picks of that week, comparing the band to the likes of the Justified Ancients of Mu Mu and Chumbawamba, "but more absurd and tasteless" and that the band "embraced rave culture in the mid-'90s and unexpectedly hit the top ten with their gold-selling third album." He highlights "(He'll Never Be An) Ol' Man River" as the breakthrough hit, but said "the best song is "Garbage", a thrashing breakbeat techno track with lyrics condemning classic rock and the endless recycling of nostalgia."

== Track listing ==
=== Original album ===
Machiavelli and the Four Seasons track listing
No.	Title	Listed title	Length
1.	"(He'll Never Be An) Ol' Man River"	I Love You Baby	2:24
2.	"All Homeboys Are Dickheads"	You and Me, Baby Love	3:08
3.	"Garbage"	Baby, I Love You	3:31
4.	"Lose Your Delusion II"	Love, Baby-You	3:35
5.	"!UOY Sevol Natas"	Its You I Love, Baby	3:36
6.	"What Nationality Is Les Murray?"	In Love with You, Baby	4:36
7.	"Greg! The Stop Sign!!"	Baby, Baby, Baby	3:28
8.	"Play Mistral for Me"	Love, Love, Love	3:44
9.	"How Do I Love Thee?"	Baby Love	5:17
10.	"Jung Talent Time"	I.L.Y.B	4:40
11.	"Aussiemandias"		4:16
12.	"Give Up for Australia" (Runs 2:30. Includes the hidden track "Phillip Glass's Arse" after a minute of silence.)		5:53
13.	"Russia" (bonus (hidden) track on 2023 CD reissue; originally appeared only on the 1994 promo CD.)		5:11

Digital bonus tracks
No.	Title	Length
13.	"The Note Stuck with a Magnet to Kurt Cobain's Fridge"	2:48
14.	"The Last Soviet Star" (edited version of "Russia" with slightly re-recorded lyrics)	5:06
15.	"Great Expectorations"	3:42
16.	"Give Up"	2:41

=== 1996 bonus disc ===
Gold! Gold! Gold for Australia!
No.	Title	Original release	Length
1.	"Jung Talent Time #1"	Jung Talent Time	3:48
2.	"Abscess Makes the Heart Grow Fonder"	(He'll Never Be An) Ol' Man River	2:46
3.	"Dicktatorship"	(He'll Never Be An) Ol' Man River	2:01
4.	"Strictly Loungeroom"	Greg! The Stop Sign!!	4:07
5.	"There's More Men in Children Than Wisdom Knows"	Greg! The Stop Sign!!	3:14
6.	"Garbage"	Garbage	3:42
7.	"Junk"	Garbage	4:42
8.	"Strictly Refuse"	Garbage	4:33
9.	"Rubbish"	Garbage	4:18
10.	"Jung Talent Time #4"	Jung Talent Time	4:11
11.	"Fuck 'Em Fuck 'Em – The Lot of 'Em"		0:35
12.	"If You Ever Hear His Name, Harden Not Your Arteries"		1:20
13.	"Does Fame Bring Forth Madness?"		0:37
14.	""Don't Believe the Hype" Is Hype"	Boys in the Hoods	1:30
15.	"Bash This Up Your Ginger"		0:45

== Personnel ==
- Peter Minack - lead vocals
- James Paull - guitar, backing vocals, vocal arrangements ("Philip Glass's Arse"), lead vocals on "Dicktatorship"
- Jack Holt - bass, backing vocals, co-lead vocals on "!UOY Sevol Natas"
- Damian Cowell - drums, lead vocals, backing vocals
- Eugene Cester - keyboards, backing vocals, co-lead vocals on "Aussiemandias" and "Russia"
- Christine Storey - soprano vocals ("Philip Glass's Arse")
- Belinda Gillam - alto vocals ("Philip Glass's Arse")
- Ewan Harwood - tenor vocals ("Philip Glass's Arse")
- Bruce Raggatt - bass vocals ("Philip Glass's Arse")
- Produced by TISM
- Recorded by Laurence Maddy except "Jung Talent Time" and "Aussiemandias" by Paul McKercher

== Charts ==
Chart performance for Machiavelli and the Four Seasons
Chart (1995–2023)	Peak position
Australian Albums (ARIA)	8
Australian Independent Albums (AIR)	1
Australian Independent Label Albums (AIR)	3

== Certifications ==
Certifications for Machiavelli and the Four Seasons
Region	Certification	Certified units/sales
Australia (ARIA)	Gold	35,000^{^}
^{^} Shipments figures based on certification alone.

== Release history ==
Release history and formats for Machiavelli and the Four Seasons
Region	Date	Format(s)	Edition	Label	Catalogue
Australia	May 1995	CD; Cassette	Standard	genre b.goode	G002
Australia	January 1996	2xCD	Re-issue (with Gold! Gold! Gold for Australia!)	genre b.goode	G002BONUS
Australia	December 1996	2xCD	Re-issue (with Machines Against The Rage)	genre b.goode	G007
Australia	October 2009	Re-issue	Digital download	genre b.goode	—N/a
Australia	July 2023	LP release	LP	MGM	GBG0036

== Book ==
A book about Machiavelli and the Four Seasons by journalist Tyler Jenke was released as part of the 33⅓ Oceania series on 1 May 2025.
