= Australia the Lucky Cunt =

- Original cover art

EP by TISM
- Released: September 1993
- Recorded: Metropolis Studios, July 1993; Melbourne Showgrounds, 24 January 1993
- Genre: Alternative rock
- Length: 17:32
- Label: Shock Records/genre b.goode
- Producer: TISM

TISM chronology
Beasts of Suburban (1992)	Australia the Lucky Cunt (1993)	Machiavelli and the Four Seasons (1995)

Censored Due to Legal Advice
- Re-issued in November 1993

Australia the Lucky Cunt is an extended play by Australian alternative rock band TISM. It was released on 3 September 1993. The title is a play on the expression "The Lucky Country".

The EP was withdrawn from sale one week after release following legal action being taken by artist and designer Ken Done due to the original cover art, which shows a koala with a syringe in its mouth. Subsequently, Done obtained an injunction order banning the sale of the EP. The EP was subsequently re-released in November 1993 under the title Censored Due to Legal Advice, with new cover art depicting an incident where Irish singer Sinéad O'Connor tore up a picture of Pope John Paul II on Saturday Night Live (with the image of the Pope being altered to the TISM logo).

The EP was later deleted from the Shock Records catalogue, and its tracks were added to the 1997 reissue of Beasts of Suburban.

On 28 October 2024, the EP was reissued on vinyl, under its "censored" title and cover art and including five contemporaneous recordings which had previously appeared as bonus tracks on the band's 1995 box set Collected Recordings 1986-1993. This reissue was released by David Roy Williams, as part of his DRW label's ongoing re-release of official and previously unreleased TISM recordings.

On 21 February 2025, the EP was reissued again by DRW, as both an expanded 4LP box set and as a 2CD format. These releases included the original EP, as well as approximately 2 hours of previous unreleased sessions from 1992 and 1993 - the period when the original tracks on Australia the Lucky Cunt were recorded. The LP version included the original, uncensored artwork, whereas the CD featured a plain pink design with the "tism" wordmark, alluding to the original.

Producer Tony Cohen said he had worked on the EP, "but someone else remixed it. The band said I made them sound too nasty. I thought that was amusing.

== Track listing ==
No.	Title	Length
1.	"Lose Your Delusion 1"	3:48
2.	"Jesus Pots the White Ball"	4:07
3.	"Mr. Ches Baragwanath, State Auditor–General"	3:52
4.	"Never Mind the Bollocks, Here's the House of Representatives"	2:41
5.	"Recorded by JJJ, 24-1-'93, Melbourne Showgrounds"	3:04

== Charts ==
Chart performance for Australia the Lucky Cunt
Chart (2025)	Peak position
Australian Independent Albums (AIR)	9

== Release history ==
Region	Date	Format(s)	Edition	Label	Catalogue
Australia	September 1993	CD; Cassette	Original	Shock Records	SHOCKCD7020/SHOCKMC7020
Australia	November 1993	CD; Cassette	Re-issue	Shock Records	SHOCKCD7020/SHOCKMC7020
