= (He'll Never Be An) Ol' Man River =

Single by TISM

from the album Machiavelli and the Four Seasons
- B-side: "Abscess Makes the Heart Grow Fonder"; "Dicktatorship"
- Released: 6 June 1995
- Recorded: September 1994
- Studio: Platinum Studios
- Genre: Dance-rock, alternative rock
- Length: 2:24
- Label: Shock/genre b.goode
- Songwriter: TISM
- Producer: Lawrence Maddy

TISM singles chronology
"Jung Talent Time" (1995)	"(He'll Never Be An) Ol' Man River" (1995)	"Greg! The Stop Sign!!" (1995)

Original artwork

"(He'll Never Be An) Ol' Man River" is a song by Australian alternative rock band TISM, released in June 1995 as the second single from their third studio album, Machiavelli and the Four Seasons. The song peaked at number 23 on the ARIA Charts, becoming the band's highest charting single and polled at number 9 in the Triple J Hottest 100, 1995.

The band performed the song on the RMITV show Under Melbourne Tonight in April 1995.

== Meaning and controversy ==
The track is a criticism of celebrity worship, using the then-recent death of River Phoenix as its focus. It contains the opening line, "I'm on the drug that killed River Phoenix".

Controversy surrounded the release of this track. Red Hot Chili Peppers' Australian-born bassist Michael "Flea" Balzary (a close friend of Phoenix) reportedly left "wanting to kill" TISM. TISM addressed this controversy in 2004: "By the same token, Hitler-Barassi says, 'I'm on the drug that killed River Phoenix', the line that famously enraged Red Hot Chili Peppers bassist Flea, 'wasn't about River Phoenix at all. That song was about fame, and the people listed in it weren't even real celebrities."

Two cover art variants exist - the first one, a mockup of Phoenix' tombstone, was rushed to the market after the song's success on radio. A second variant, featuring an image of various drug pills and the hook, "I'm on the drug that killed River Phoenix", was released shortly after.

== Reception ==
Double J named it in the top fifty Australian songs of the 1990s, saying, "The song is a riotous techno-punk romp that namechecks a range of celebrity deaths, prodding those who obsess over these morbid events far more than the celebrities themselves. Like TISM's best work, you can take it on its provocative face value or, you know, read the lyrics."

== Track list ==
CD single (G003)

1. "(He'll Never Be An) Ol' Man River" – 2:25
2. "Abscess Makes the Heart Grow Fonder" – 2:47
3. "Dicktatorship" – 2:00

== Personnel ==
- Damian Cowell – lead vocals (choruses)
- Peter Minack – lead vocals (verses)
- Jack Holt – bass
- James Paull – electric guitar
- Eugene Cester – keyboards

== Charts ==
Chart performance for "(He'll Never Be An) Ol' Man River"
Chart (1995)	Peak position
Australia (ARIA)	23
