= TISM =

Australian rock band

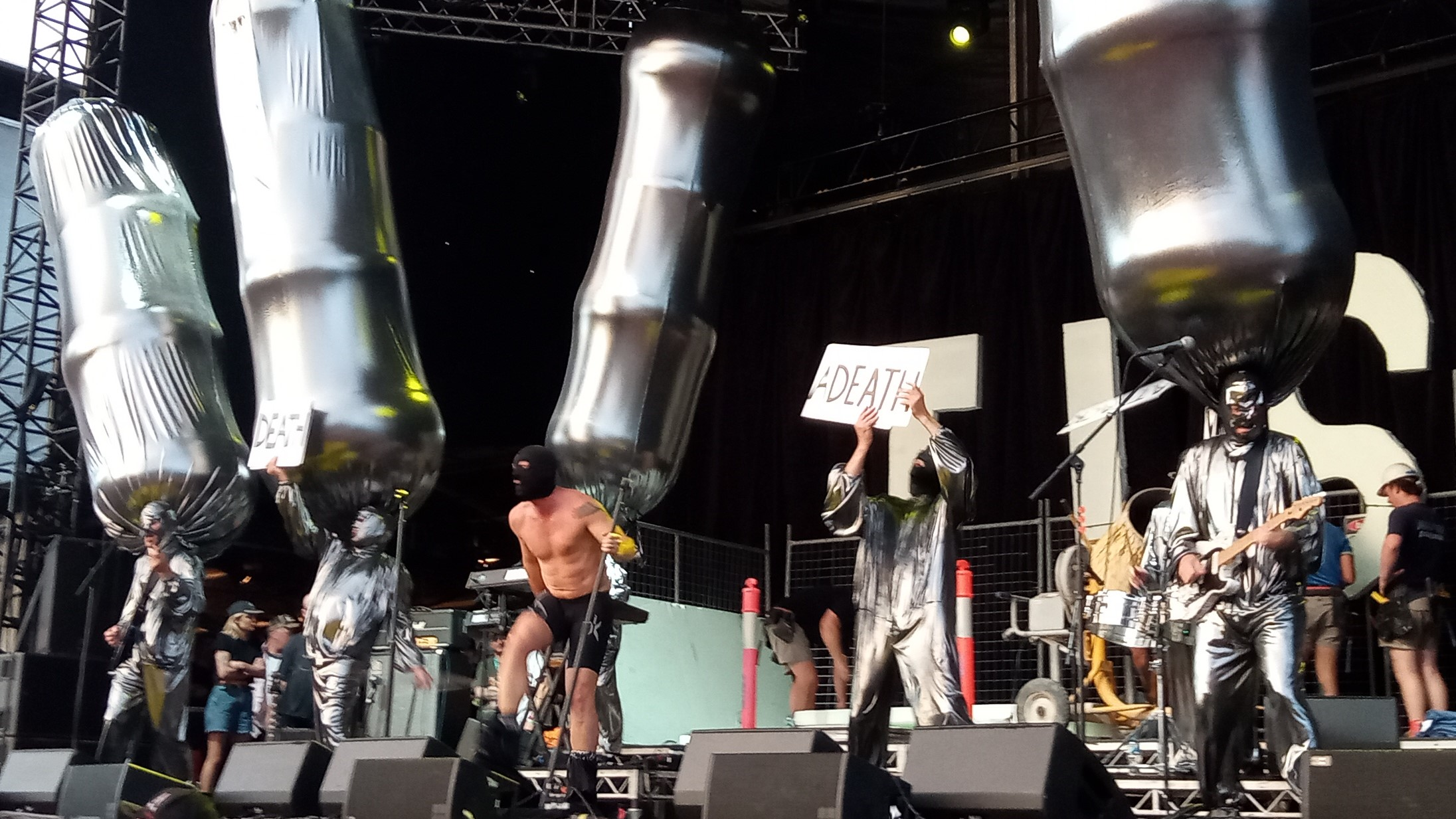
- TISM live in Brisbane, December 2022

Background information
- Also known as: This Is Serious Mum^{[note]}
- Origin: Melbourne, Victoria, Australia
- Genres: Alternative rock; alternative dance; dance-rock; electronic rock; synth-pop; synth-rock
- Years active: 1982–1983; 1984–2004; 2022–present
- Labels: Elvis; Musicland; Phonogram; Shock; FMR; Madman; Sony BMG; DRW Entertainment; genre b.goode
- Members: Ron Hitler-Barassi; Humphrey B. Flaubert; Jock Cheese; Eugene de la Hot-Croix Bun; Jon St. Peenis (II); Les Miserables (II); Vladimir Lenin-McCartney (II)
- Past members: Genre B. Goode; Leek Van Vlalen; Jon St. Peenis (I); Les Miserables (I); Tokin' Blackman; Vladimir Lenin-McCartney (I)
- Website: tismworld.com

TISM (/ˈtɪzəm/ TIZ-əm; an acronym of This Is Serious Mum) are a seven-piece anonymous alternative rock band, formed in Melbourne, Australia, on 30 December 1982 by vocalist/drummer Humphrey B. Flaubert, bassist/vocalist Jock Cheese, vocalist Ron Hitler-Barassi and keyboardist/vocalist Eugene de la Hot Croix Bun. These four members have formed the core of the band since their inception, with the line-up being rounded out by guitarists Leak Van Vlalen (1982–1991), Tokin' Blackman (1991–2004; died 2008) and Vladimir Lenin-McCartney (2022–present), as well as backing vocalists/dancers Les Miserables and Jon St. Peenis.

Noted for their dark humour, sarcastic delivery and melodic songwriting, the seven members of TISM appear in public as a pseudonymous, semi-paramilitary collective masked in a variety of balaclavas (usually as part of a more elaborate costume), and are known for their "chaotic" appearances in Australian media, often frustrating interviewers with absurd non sequiturs and tongue-in-cheek nihilism. Their catalogue is replete with references to popular culture, particularly literature, music and Australian rules football; their (usually derogatory) references to celebrities have sometimes incurred controversy and even censorship.

They developed a large underground following throughout the 1980s and 1990s, issuing a number of singles, albums, videos, a short-lived line of comics, and one book. Backed by the successful singles "(He'll Never Be An) Ol' Man River" and "Greg! The Stop Sign!!", their third album, Machiavelli and the Four Seasons, reached the Australian national top 10 in 1995, won Best Independent Release at that year's ARIA Music Awards, and was certified Gold in January 1996. TISM split following their first live performance in December 1983; every live show since has been considered a "reunion" concert.

The band split again in late 2004 following the release of their sixth album, The White Albun. Their last single, "Everyone Else Has Had More Sex Than Me", enjoyed viral popularity due in large part to its animated music video. Following an almost 18-year hiatus, TISM reformed in June 2022, returning to the stage for a series of three "secret" shows in Melbourne throughout November, prior to their appearances on the line-up of Good Things festival in December. They released their seventh album, Death to Art, in October 2024, following a 20-year gap since the release of The White Albun.

== History ==
=== 1982–1984: Early years, first break up and reunion ===
In December 1982, Humphrey B. Flaubert (Damian Cowell – drums and lead vocals), Ron Hitler-Barassi (Peter Minack – vocals), Eugene de la Hot-Croix Bun (Eugene Cester – keyboards and backing vocals), Jock Cheese (Jack Holt – guitar, bass and backing vocals), and Leak Van Vlalen (Sean Kelly – guitar) recorded a nine song bedroom cassette titled Great Truckin' Songs of the Renaissance under the name This Is Serious Mum. All of them aside from Hitler-Barassi had been a part of various bands such as Tall Stories and I Can Run in the early 1980s. The line-up would soon expand to include Les Miserables (Andrew Miglietti - vocals) and Genre B. Goode (vocals) by the following year.

This Is Serious Mum continued to record private home-made demos (with titles including Hooked on Crap and It's Novel! It's Unique! It's Shithouse!) throughout 1983, producing over one hundred songs within twelve months. This period of activity culminated in the band's first public appearance, at the Duncan Mackinnon Athletics Reserve in the small suburb of Murrumbeena on 6 December 1983. The so-called "Get Fucked Concert" was considered an "artistic and commercial failure", causing the band to split up; thus giving the show the dubious honour of simultaneously being the band's debut and farewell, and making every subsequent performance a "reunion" show.

TISM returned to home-made recordings in February 1984. During this period they briefly experimented with dark ambient and industrial music, before returning to their former style. On 25 November 1984, the band performed their first "reunion" show at the University of Melbourne. At the show they released a self-titled demo tape which they recorded earlier that year at the home studio of Serious Young Insects drummer Mark White. Only eleven copies of the demo (which featured examples of their brief flirtation with industrial music) were made available at the show; all had sold by the time the band finished their short set.

=== 1985–1990: First releases, Great Truckin' Songs of the Renaissance and Hot Dogma ===
By 1985, TISM were playing regularly around Melbourne. They released their debut single, "Defecate on My Face", in 1986; a 7" vinyl record packaged in a 12" sleeve with all four sides glued shut. The song is also found (in an unlisted "country" version) on the mini-album Form and Meaning Reach Ultimate Communion. Their next single, "40 Years – Then Death", was released in 1987 on transparent vinyl in a clear plastic sleeve with no cover art or labels. TISM's first radio-friendly single, despite the obscure packaging, was received well.

TISM's debut album Great Truckin' Songs of the Renaissance was released in 1988, as a double vinyl release in an embossed gatefold sleeve. The first record contained twelve of TISM's most popular tracks, and the second was a collage of interviews, bedroom recordings and live "diatribes" from Ron Hitler-Barassi. Great Truckin' Songs of the Renaissance entered the lower reaches of Australia's mainstream Top 50, as did the single "Saturday Night Palsy", the following year. The group appeared on the long-running variety TV program Hey Hey It's Saturday performing the single; during this appearance three additional seven-person line-ups joined the initial seven members of the band onstage, leading to a total of twenty-eight "members" of TISM miming the song by the end of the performance.

In 1989, TISM self-published a book compiling lyrics, interviews and press releases titled The TISM Guide to Little Aesthetics, however the book could not be released until early 1990 as TISM, having been threatened with legal action for libel, were required to censor the book, which they did by hand with a mixture of white-out and permanent marker (also placing stickers reading "CENSORED DUE TO LEGAL ADVICE" on the cover of each copy). Despite this, some uncensored copies exist, and a document with the censored content is available.

In 1990, TISM entered negotiations with CBS Records and Phonogram Records and were signed by the latter. In April that year, the band began work on what would become their next album with producer Laurence Maddy. When Phonogram released Hot Dogma in 1990, it failed to reach the commercial charts, and TISM were fired six months later due to management issues, despite owing the label tens of thousands of dollars. Hot Dogma is the first release to use the acronymic form of the band's name exclusively.

Over two nights in May 1991, the band were filmed live and released the video Incontinent in Ten Continents. These performances were the last for guitarist Leak Van Vlalen.

=== 1991–1998: Rise to fame, Machiavelli and the Four Seasons and www.tism.wanker.com ===
In mid-1991, TISM signed with independent record label Shock Records and re-issued Great Truckin' Songs of the Renaissance, as well as the EP Gentlemen, Start Your Egos; a compilation of tracks previously unavailable on CD. TISM, with producer Tony Cohen, released the EP Beasts of Suburban in 1992. A new guitarist, Tony Coitus (later Tokin' Blackman) joined the group onstage for the first time on 23 January 1992. Les Miserables and Jon St. Peenis left following the Beasts of Suburban tour, replaced by two new dancers who inherited their stage names.

The 1993 EP, Australia the Lucky Cunt was the group's most controversial release to date. Courts issued an injunction order of the CD when the Ken Done Society threatened legal action over the artwork, which parodied Done's signature style and depicted a koala sucking a syringe. The matter was settled for an undisclosed amount of money "fairly close to the amount that Radiohead spends on buying friends", and the EP was re-released with a new cover graphic and title: Censored Due to Legal Advice. During 1994, TISM sometimes played under the names "The Frank Vitkovic Jazz Quartet", "Machiavelli and the Four Seasons" (which would later be used as an album title) and "Late for Breakfast".

TISM's third album, 1995's Machiavelli and the Four Seasons, was their biggest success; a shift from alternative rock to synth-driven techno and dance, which retained the band's usual vocal melodies and loud guitars. Three of its singles reached Triple J's Hottest 100, two of them in the top 10 in 1995. The album was certified gold and won the ARIA Award for Best Independent Release. Success exposed TISM to mainstream Australian radio and television, most of which was perplexed by the band's guerrilla approach to interviews and lack of interest in the music industry.

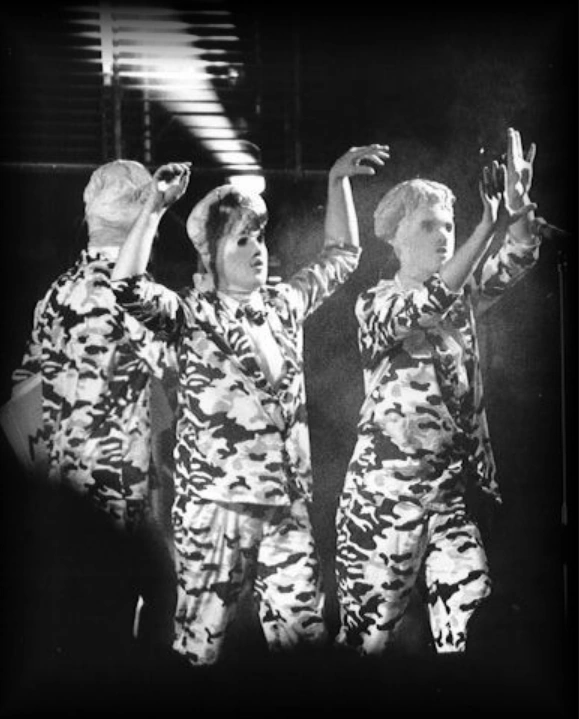
TISM on the Machiavelli and the Four Seasons tour, 1995

On 27 April 1995, the band appeared on the RMITV show Under Melbourne Tonight and performed "Protest Song" and "(He'll Never Be An) Ol' Man River". In June, Humphrey B. Flaubert and Ron Hitler-Barassi appeared as guest programmers on the long-running late night music program Rage, where they aired clips by artists such as the Wiggles, the Bay City Rollers and Leif Garrett. A four CD box set, Collected Recordings 1986–1993, was released in December, and steady record sales allowed extensive tours of Australia and New Zealand.

In 1996 TISM toured on the Big Day Out, during which Hitler-Barassi was either absent or requiring a wheelchair due to a detached retina and broken arm caused by a stage dive he performed at the Pacific Hotel, Lorne, Victoria prior to the tour. Later the same year, TISM toured England, the group's sole Northern Hemisphere excursion.

Taking a year off from touring, TISM spent 1997 working on their next album with producer Lachlan Magoo. The album, www.tism.wanker.com was released in 1998. The first official music video for the album, "I Might Be a Cunt, but I'm Not a Fucking Cunt" was rarely broadcast. Returned and Services League of Australia head Bruce Ruxton wrote a letter of complaint to Shock Records describing it as "... Dropping [Australia's standards] through the floor into the proverbial sewer." The letter was published on TISM's official website at the time, alongside the single's press release.

In 2015, when asked if the choice to release "I Might Be a Cunt, but I'm Not a Fucking Cunt" as a follow up single after commercial success, was meant as a mocking message to the music industry. Cowell stated that it was instead hubris, as they had believed that their radio play at the time would allow them to get away with anything, but instead the band never truly recovered.

www.tism.wanker.com sold well, thanks in part to an extensive Australian tour with Regurgitator, then at the height of their popularity, and the Fauves; however, sales were low compared to Machiavelli and the Four Seasons's success and TISM's contract with Shock ended by mutual agreement.

=== 1999–2002: Festival Records and De RigueurMortis ===
Following the 1998 tour, TISM signed with Festival Mushroom Records, which re-released their entire back catalogue (except for Hot Dogma, their previous singles and the bonus discs for Machiavelli and wanker.com) on CD.

Their first and only official album with Festival Mushroom Records was De RigueurMortis, released in 2001. It débuted at No. 24 on the ARIA chart and No. 3 on the Alternative ARIA Chart. Flaubert predicted on Triple J radio that the album would "plummet out of the top 40 like a stone"; – the following week, it was not on the list. Touring became less thorough than in previous years, though no less active – at the closing of the Punters Club, the band ended up naked and tore the ceiling down during the gig.

In early 2002, the track "Honk If You Love Fred Durst" was released as a single. In 2002, Festival Mushroom Records released tism.bestoff., a best of compilation which included their greatest hits, two new tracks and a disc of remastered Bedroom Recordings. The compilation was their third, and last, release with Festival Mushroom Records, as TISM's contract had ended. Finding themselves with no record label again, TISM returned to touring.

=== 2003–2006: The White Albun and last appearances ===
On 6 January 2003, bassist Jock Cheese released a solo album, Platter, on Shock Records. The album was co-written by Cheese with Ron Hitler-Barassi and Humphrey B. Flaubert, and contained the full version of "Unfair", a track previously excerpted as the introduction to De RigueurMortis. Guitarist Tokin' Blackman contributes classical guitar to one track; otherwise most of the album's instruments were recorded by Cheese.

On September 26, TISM held a special one-off concert at the Hi-Fi Bar in Melbourne, presented as the "Save Our TISM" telethon, in which they solicited donations from the public to keep them from breaking up; despite apparently receiving the desired amount, the band "split" at the end of the show. The performance was filmed and released as part of the three-disc CD/DVD package The White Albun in 2004 by Madman Entertainment. Despite the "split", TISM continued to perform in order to promote the release of The White Albun, which also included the group's sixth studio album, and an additional DVD containing a short documentary, the band's music videos, and a collection of home videos. The three disc set received good reviews; however, it was not eligible for ARIA chart tracking.

Snapshot of the "Everyone Else Has Had More Sex Than Me" music video by animator Bernard Derriman

At the band's penultimate concert on 13 November 2004, Hitler-Barassi delivered a diatribe saying that the band had "lost the election" and made references to Guy Sebastian winning that year's season of Australian Idol. This show was followed by the band's last live performance for almost two decades, at the Earthcore festival later in the month. Following this show, TISM - quietly and without fanfare - disbanded.

In 2005, TISM released the single "Everyone Else Has Had More Sex Than Me" in the German market. Sony/BMG Germany expressed interest in the song when its animated clip by Bernard Derriman became a viral hit, thanks to bloggers and sites such as YouTube. The single reached the German commercial charts.

In October 2006, TISM were inducted into the EG Hall of Fame, at which they made an appearance and "a hilariously irreverent speech". When asked about the current status of TISM at the time, Humphrey B. Flaubert remarked "we are slowly moving towards our deaths".

=== 2006–2019: Post-TISM activity ===
In early 2005, Damian Cowell (the former Humphrey B. Flaubert) formed a country and western band called Root!, producing a series of demos under the name "DC Root". The project continued until 2010, producing two albums and an EP. Cowell followed Root! with The DC3, featuring Root! guitarist Henri Grawe. The project, which released its first single "I Was the Guy in TISM" in 2010, continued until 2013, producing two albums. Following The DC3, Cowell formed Damian Cowell's Disco Machine, which to date has produced three albums.

On 9 April 2008, James "Jock" Paull (best known as TISM's long-time guitarist Tokin' Blackman) died of lung cancer. In October 2009, the majority of TISM's back catalogue was re-released on iTunes with bonus material. In March 2010, a "21st century mix" of their single "Shut Up – The Footy's on the Radio" was released on iTunes. The 21st century mix features Humphrey B. Flaubert on vocals and Jock Cheese on guitars, and had wholly new lyrics. In April 2012, former guitarist Sean Kelly (aka Leak Van Vlalen) performed a series of songs live with satirist/musician Kieran Butler as "RealiTISM". Kelly has continued to play TISM material live in years since.

In 2015, appetite for a TISM reunion began to build after Australia was formally invited to join that year's Eurovision Song Contest. According to two competing Change.org petitions, TISM was 37 times more popular a choice for Australia's Eurovision representative than Kylie Minogue, with the petition for TISM receiving over 14,000 signatures in support. Flaubert refused to comment at the time, however suggested that "if a giant multinational with [a] horrendous human rights record was to give me a huge cheque I'll dob in my grandmother". Australia's representative for the 2015 Eurovision song contest was ultimately Guy Sebastian with the song "Tonight Again", which came in fifth place.

Australia has continued to participate in Eurovision in the years since, with TISM occasionally being suggested as Australia's representative - including in 2018 by the future 31st Prime Minister of Australia Anthony Albanese. Albanese, a known TISM fan, also featured "(He'll Never Be An) Ol' Man River" in a DJ set at the Corner Hotel in Richmond in June 2016. In September 2017, Albanese described TISM as having "a bit of dark humour, I think it's fair to say... but they were just great fun."

In response to the growing demand for a TISM reunion, in April 2015 Damian Cowell said "if TISM came back, it would be shithouse. That's the answer... to that question. I think that's sort of the point that eludes most bands that make a comeback. They don't ask that question, 'will it be shithouse or not?' And because they don't ask that question, they go out and it's shithouse."

=== 2020–2021: Reissue campaign ===
On 22 January 2020, TISM released their back catalogue on Spotify. In February, a proposal from Melbourne politician David Limbrick to rename the Mordialloc Freeway the "TISM Mordialloc Freeway" was rejected by the Victorian government. On 10 April, Live at the Corner Hotel 30 May 1988, a recording of a concert at that venue which had previously circulated as a bootleg, was released digitally by the Australian Road Crew Initiative as a benefit for music employees put out of work by the COVID-19 pandemic.

On 14 October 2020, a press release credited (for the first time in 12 years) to Ron Hitler-Barassi was published at www.tism.net.au. It concluded by saying that TISM would begin a CD and vinyl reissue campaign with former head of Shock Records, David Williams. The reissue campaign began 21 December with the release of a recording of TISM's last live performance at the 2004 Earthcore festival, titled On Behalf of TISM I Would Like To Concede We Have Lost the Election, and a transparent vinyl disc containing almost two hours of silence (pressed at Abbey Road Studios), titled The TISM Omni-Album. These were TISM's first vinyl releases in 30 years, and first physical releases since their final studio album, The White Albun, in 2004.

On 17 November 2020, a vinyl single featuring a cover of AC/DC's "For Those About to Rock" was released in a variety of editions, featuring cover art designed by four of the band's members. The song had been recorded in the 1990s for an AC/DC tribute album but was never released, although excerpts had circulated in the TISM fan community for many years. The single's B-side was "Let's Hang Around the Shopping Centre", another unreleased song dating to the post-www.tism.wanker.com era. The release of the single was also accompanied by the first release of official TISM T-shirts (featuring two of the aforementioned cover designs) in 16 years.

TISM's reissue campaign continued in 2021 with the June release of the Record Store Day exclusive limited edition 7" single "Mistah Eliot – He Wanker", featuring an unreleased version of "Kill Yourself Now and Avoid the Rush" on the B-side, and in July, the first wide release of their 1984 self-titled demo This Is Serious Mum on vinyl and CD, and Punt Road, a 1987 rehearsal session, also on vinyl and CD. In September a compilation of the group's remixes, Collected Remixes, was issued on vinyl only. In November, the mini-album Form and Meaning Reach Ultimate Communion was reissued on vinyl and, for the first time, on CD.

=== 2022–2025: Reunion, Good Things Festival, New music and Death to Art ===
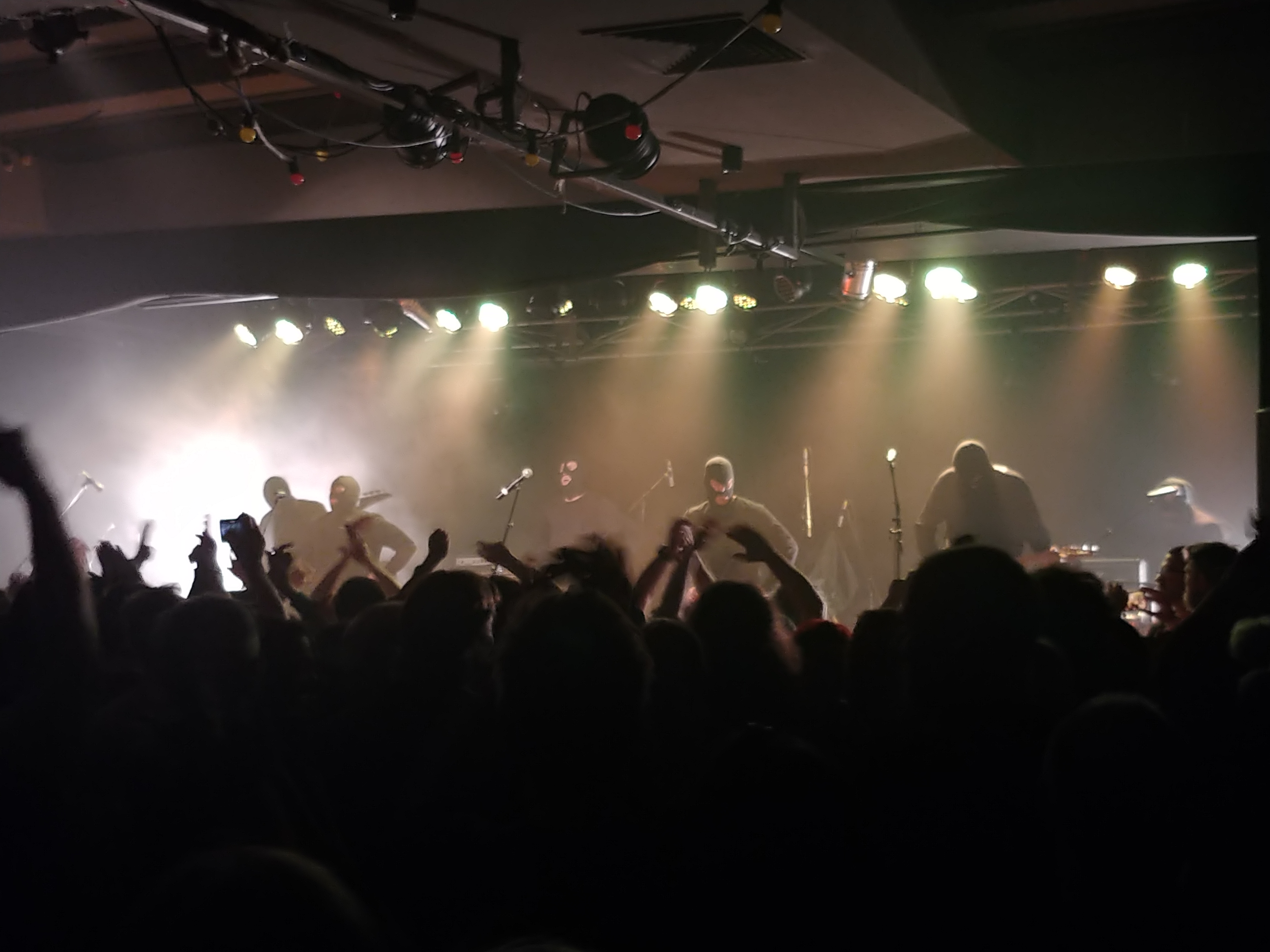
TISM appearing onstage for the first time in 18 years at a secret show at the Croxton Bandroom in Thornbury, 12 November 2022

On 15 June 2022, TISM were announced as one of the headlining acts on the 2022 edition of Good Things, and were said to be playing their first performances since 2004 exclusively as part of the festival. Shortly following this announcement, TISM founders Humphrey B. Flaubert and Ron Hitler-Barassi made their first media appearances in sixteen years, providing interviews to Music Feeds and Guardian Australia, as well as Double J and ABC Radio in Sydney and Melbourne, and almost immediately prompting a (tongue-in-cheek) feud with Regurgitator, who were also appearing at Good Things.

A box set edition of their first single "Defecate on My Face" (containing the 7" single along with an additional 12" record and CD) was released in August 2022, alongside a compilation of the band's A-sides, Collected Versus: The Complete TISM Singles, on CD and vinyl. The CD edition of Collected Versus contains the remix compilation Collected Remixes on the second disc, and features liner notes from former Rolling Stone Australia editor Tyler Jenke, while the LP version features liner notes by Williams. An alternate edition of Collected Versus was released for the American market in early November, with a different second disc, titled Kill Americans: A TISM Primer, featuring a selection of album tracks intended as a wider introduction to the band's work.

On 17 October, former guitarist Sean Kelly (Leak Van Vlalen) confirmed he was not rejoining TISM, as the band required a guitarist who could comfortably cover both Kelly's parts and those of the late James "Jock" Paull (or Tokin' Blackman). Shortly afterwards, it was announced that TISM's new guitarist was named Vladimir Lenin-McCartney.

Three weeks ahead of Good Things, on 12 November 2022, the reunited TISM held their first concert in 18 years, an hour-long secret show at the Croxton Bandroom in Thornbury. A second secret show followed the weekend after, at the Prince Bandroom in St. Kilda, on 19 November. Later that night, Flaubert and Hitler-Barassi made their second appearance on the music program Rage, again providing an eclectic and eccentric series of programming choices, such as a 1970s Four Corners report on the middle class, and tracks by Crazy Frog, Mark "Jacko" Jackson and Jim Steinman.

On 25 November 2022, www.tism.wanker.com was reissued on CD and limited edition blue-coloured vinyl, preceding an expanded seven-disc vinyl box set edition entitled Wanker Box, which was eventually released in May 2023. A two-disc limited coloured vinyl edition of the live album Machines Against the Rage was also released on 25 November, featuring the full setlist.

TISM played all three dates of Good Things from 2–4 December 2022 in Melbourne, Sydney and Brisbane. During these three shows, the band were outfitted in silver costumes with large helium balloons attached; a group of tradesmen also appeared onstage during the set and erected a set of foam letters reading "TISN".

From 2023 to 2025, the band would announce and release many box sets of their albums and EPs, some of which as anniversary releases, including The Beasts of Suburban, Australia the Lucky Cunt, Machiavelli and the Four Seasons, and www.tism.wanker.com, all of which containing alternative mixes, old contemporary demo recordings, and previously-unreleased songs.

On 18 August 2023, the band released Hot Dogma Sing Sing Sessions, a demo tape recorded for their album Hot Dogma containing previously unreleased songs and six recordings that previously appeared on Collected Recordings 1986–1993.

On 30 November 2023, the band released the single "I've Gone Hillsong" on music streaming services, a satire from the perspective of the Hillsong Church. It marked their first new song in 19 years, and the first with Lenin-McCartney on guitar. The B-side of the single contained a new diatribe performed by Hitler-Barassi, "Schopenhauer's SUV". The band also teased three new shows on Australia's east coast for early 2024 to accompany the Museum of Old and New Art concert. On 8 December 2023, the band announced their new EP The "C" Word and was released the following week on 15 December 2023. It was the band's first EP in 30 years, since the release of Australia the Lucky Cunt in 1993. "The 'C' Word" and "I've Gone Hillsong" hit No. 1 and No. 3 on the Australian Independent Record Labels Association's single charts.

On 16 April 2024, the band released No Penis, No God, a gospel album they had recorded in January 1996, which had remained for the most part unreleased (nine tracks had been previously issued as iTunes bonus tracks on www.tism.wanker.com in 2009), as a limited-edition bootleg-style LP.

The band debuted their song "Death to Art" on Double J on 11 July. The song was released as a single two days later, with another diatribe, "Suspected Illegal Entry Vessel 915 (The Ballad of Jen and Steve)", as the B-side. Another single, "70s Football", would precede the band's seventh studio album entitled Death to Art, released on 4 October 2024. A three date headlining tour supporting the album would take place at Brisbane, Melbourne, and Sydney from 20 October to 29 November, with supporting bands Eskimo Joe, Machine Gun Fellatio, Ben Lee, and The Mavis's.

The 26th of August saw Jenke announce a 33 1/3 book about Machiavelli and the Four Seasons, with a 1 May 2025 release date, three days before the album's 30th anniversary.

On 24 November, the band appeared on Spicks and Specks, performing a mashup of the Gorillaz' "Clint Eastwood" with parts of "Tradies Get the Ladies", a diatribe the band had recited at Good Things. This was technically the first appearance of the band's current guitarist Vladimir Lenin-McCartney II, due to being filmed in May, however did not air until November.

On 30 April 2025, Jock Cheese appeared at the APRA Music Awards.

=== 2026-present: Sydney Opera House shows, Wankers of the World, Unite! and No Mistakes Tour ===
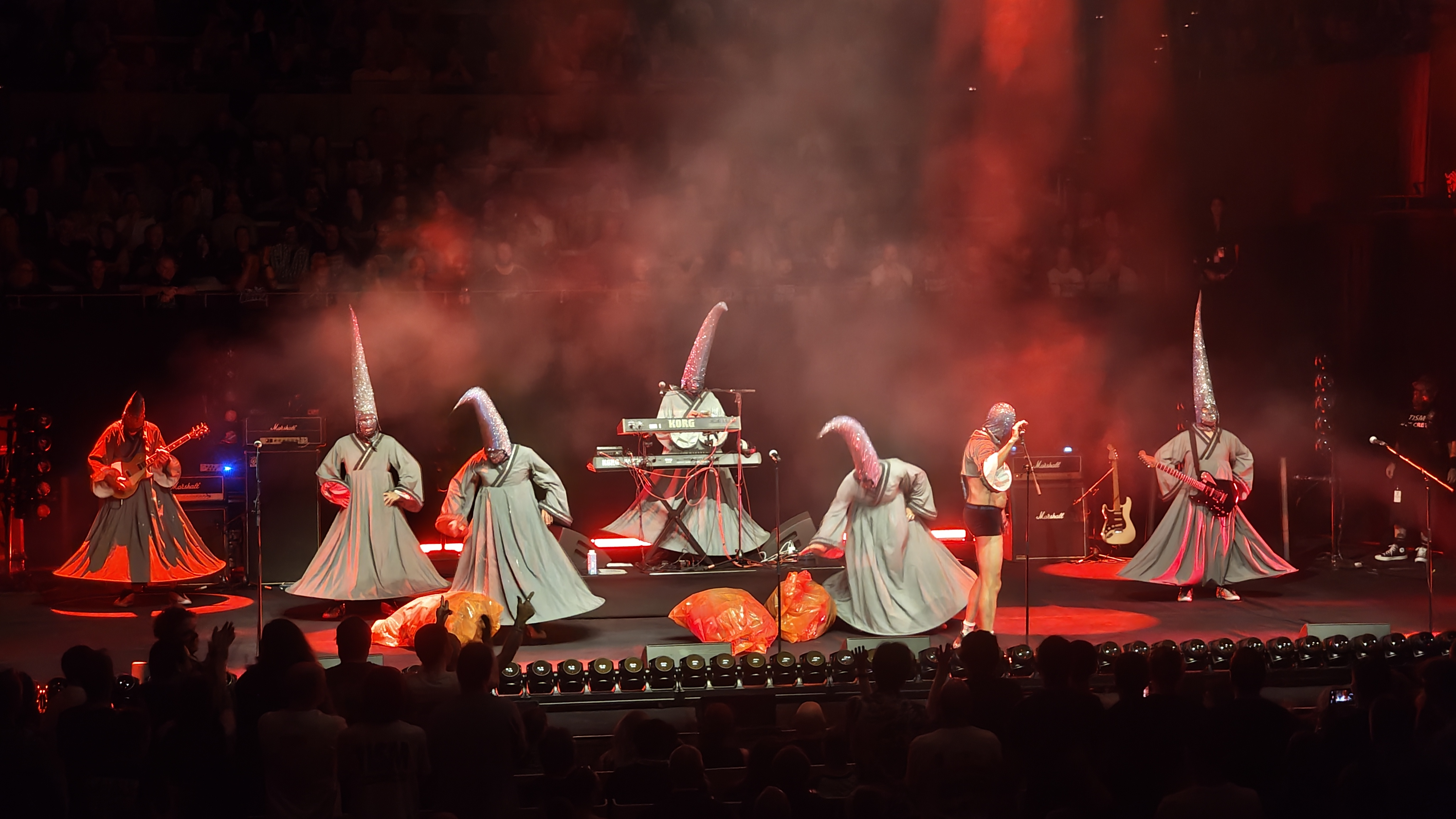
TISM performing at the Sydney Opera House, April, 2026.

10 November 2025 saw the band announcing a performance of their third album, Machiavelli and the Four Seasons at the Sydney Opera House, scheduled for 10 & 12 April 2026.

On 10 February 2026, the band announced a one-off show at the Port Melbourne Industrial Centre for the Arts (PICA) entitled "Wankers of the World, Unite!" to take place on 2 May that year. On 26 March, the band announced three support acts for their show at PICA; The Belair Lip Bombs, Dr Sure's Unusual Practice, and Large Mirage. It was also announced that a screening of a film would take place at PICA entitled "Death to Art Live at Sidney Myer Music Bowl", a film of their live show at the Sidney Myer Music Bowl in Melbourne in 2024. They later announced three more support acts; Sandy Dish, Hot Machine, and Drunk Mums. The show saw TISM performances on all three stages of the venue, with both real and fake TISM members populating each stage as a seven-piece, totalling up to 21 TISM performers. At one point, all three TISM bands played at the same time, while at others, two bands would perform the same song slightly out of sync. The gig was described as "chaotic" by audience members.

On 29 March 2026, the band performed a secret Melbourne show at the Howler in Brunswick. The show was completely unannounced, with them appearing between Full Flower Moon Band and Drunk Mums to play a warm-up set ahead of their Sydney dates. The band performed Machiavelli and the Four Seasons in full, alongside other tracks from their discography.

On 8 April 2026, the band announced they were to headline at the Adelaide Beer & BBQ Festival on 10 July 2026. The band would later announce their first national tour in 30 years on 19 May 2026, with their Adelaide performance beginning a thirteen date tour, billed as TSIM: No Mistakes, playing in Darwin, Hobart, Melbourne, Adelaide, Brisbane, Canberra, Perth, Sydney, and Wollongong between July and November 2026. As part of their press release they also announced that they had been fined $18,488 by the Sydney Opera House, due to damage to seats during their shows in April.

The No Mistakes Tour began on 1 October at the Odeon in Hobart. On 7 October, the band surprise-released "Clint Eastwood/Tradies Get the Ladies" as a single. On the tour, the band have used two differing stage shows and setlists. One of them featured a seven-piece, gold-clad yacht rock band, including former Disco Machine members Emily Jarrett and Rebecca Chapman, playing a separate set of cover songs behind TISM, who themselves were wearing the same costumes as the yacht rock band. The second one featured the band wearing grey hooded robes with purple balaclavas, while a bundle of silver balloons hung behind them - the balloons would be released into the crowd during the last song. A third set, devised specially for the third Melbourne show, revived the silver costumes and puppets from the Sydney Opera House shows; the band's management mentioned in a press release that this was likely to be the final use of the costumes. At the University of Wollongong, the band wore reflective squares on their heads with foil clothing. They played a modified version of the set used for the third Melbourne show, adding a second encore exclusive to Wollongong. Between the first and second encores, the band remained on stage and changed their costumes to all-black clothing. During "Defecate on My Face", the final song of the night, members of the audience were brought up on stage to dance and sing with the band.

On 31 October 2026, TISM released a statement alongside their management company, DRW Entertainment, addressing sexual harassment that had occurred against support band Laura & The Hell Cutz at the previous night's show at the Enmore Theatre. David Roy Williams, the head of DRW Entertainment, also recited a speech at the last show of the tour warning against misogynistic behaviour in the audience.

== Members ==
TISM members are pseudonymous and anonymous, and wear balaclavas during almost all of their public appearances. However, most of their names have been revealed (see below).

Current

Stage name	Real name	Role	Period
Ron Hitler-Barassi	Peter Minack	Vocals, dancing	1983–2004, 2022–present
Humphrey B. Flaubert	Damian Cowell	Drum programming, samples, vocals, dancing	1982–2004, 2022–present
Jock Cheese	John "Jack" Holt	Bass, vocals, guitar	1982–2004, 2022–present
Vladimir Lenin-McCartney (II)		Guitar, vocals, banjo	2024–present
Eugene de la Hot-Croix Bun	Eugene Cester	Keyboards, vocals	1982–2004, 2022–present
Jon St. Peenis (II)		Dancing, vocals	1992–2004, 2022–present
Les Miserables (II)		Dancing, vocals	1992–2004, 2022–present

Former

Stage name	Real name	Role	Period
Tokin' Blackman (first billed as Tony Coitus)	James Paull	Guitar, vocals	1991–2004 (died 2008)
Leak Van Vlalen	Sean Kelly	Guitar	1982–1991
Vladimir Lenin-McCartney (I)		Guitar, vocals	2022–2024
Genre B. Goode		Vocals	1982–1985
Les Miserables (I)	Andrew Miglietti	Dancing, vocals	1982–1993
Jon St. Peenis (I)	Mark Fessey	Saxophone, dancing	1985–1993

Cheese plays guitar on various recordings and live shows, and Blackman arranged orchestral sections on The White Albun (2004). Flaubert usually limits drum parts to programmed rhythms and samples, but has occasionally played acoustic drumkits live.

There has been more than one person performing under the Les Miserables name, as confirmed by Sean Kelly (Leak Van Vlalen) during the "RealiTISM" video.

=== Identities ===
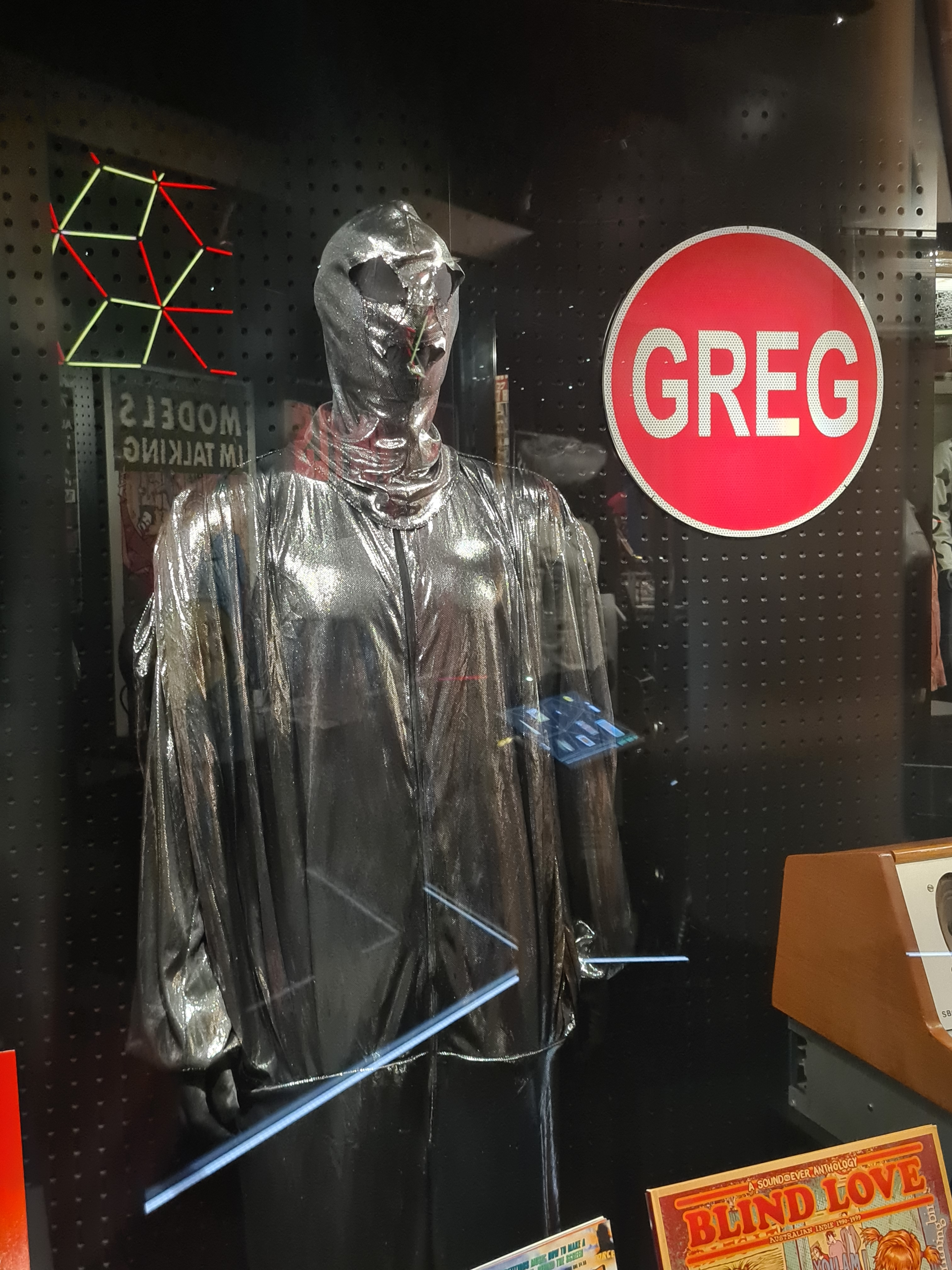
A TISM costume alongside a sign from "Greg! The Stop Sign!!", Australian Music Vault, Melbourne

TISM have never officially revealed their names, instead choosing to use pseudonyms on their records and in interviews, all the while concealing their faces. Usually this involves the wearing of a balaclava, but outrageous costumes have been created for the purpose, including Ku Klux Klan uniforms made of newspaper, silver suits with puffy arms and legs to mimic an inflated cask wine bladder, giant foam paintings worn on the head, large foam signs bearing the name of a Beatle, fat 'businessman' suits, and eight-foot-high inflatable headpieces among others.

Who TISM are beneath the masks has been the cause of much speculation by fans, with one theory contending that TISM is composed of members of other bands who do not want their fans to find out: popular targets of this theory include Painters and Dockers, Machine Gun Fellatio and even The Wiggles. A theory based on the band's tour schedule's roughly coinciding with school holidays, and the fact that the Ringwood Secondary College Choir and Orchestra feature in the filmclip to Thunderbirds Are Coming Out, proposes that TISM are school teachers. Another common theory, based on the high incidence of Australian rules football references in their lyrics, is that they are or were players in the AFL, however Humphrey B. Flaubert has stated that "We're actually not AFL, we're more violent and crappy... so you're looking at the VFL there."

When asked why they wear masks, Flaubert replied:

The answer that makes me sound good is that we desired to circumvent the cult of personality that is inherent in rock music by choosing to remain anonymous. Unlike every other band in rock we chose to be anonymous. The answer that makes me sound good would probably also incorporate some lengthy discussion about Brechtian alienation techniques, about our post modernist grasp of ever cooling universe, and a dehumanising society encapsulated in the somewhat paramilitary aspect of our clothing. All of those things would make me sound good, but actually we’re really boring guys."

— Humphrey B. Flaubert, Return of the Pop Vigilantes (21 February 2002)

However, when TISM performed on John Safran's Music Jamboree in 2002 playing "(He'll Never Be An) Ol' Man River" on instruments from Greece, the song writers' names were revealed during the credit roll which read "'(He'll Never Be An) Ol' Man River' by Damian Cowell / Peter Minack / Jack Holt / James Paull / Eugene Cester ... Performed by TISM." Up until then, the songwriters' names were publicly available on the APRA/AMCOS database, but now the songwriting credits on the site just say "TISM" instead of the members' real names; Damian Cowell's real name is listed as one of the songwriters of Root!'s songs, however. The tracks from the band's comeback album Death to Art are also credited on the database to Minack, Cowell, Holt and Cester.

The song writers' names were also published later, alongside information on "Everyone Else Has Had More Sex Than Me" when it hit success in Sweden and Germany in 2004.

Earlier, Hitler-Barassi was photographed in 1993 at the opening night of Madame Butterfly, which was published on 4 April 1993; the book revealed the member to be Peter Minack, who later released a book of his own (Campaigning With Grant) in 2000 about the American Civil War. The book contains thin references to TISM. In interviews about his book, Minack revealed he was a teacher, his father fought in World War II for the Germans, and that he is fanatical about the Richmond Football Club, explaining his stage moniker. On 6 June 2026, the Herald Sun published an article about Minack, claiming he was a teacher at Sacred Heart Girls' College and that he and TISM were anti-semitic. The article received backlash from TISM fans, including Melbourne politician David Limbrick.

Guitarist Tokin Blackman's real name was James "Jock" Paull. Paull died of cancer on 9 April 2008 at the age of 50.

Eugene Cester was revealed in an Age column as being the uncle of Nic and Chris Cester of Melbourne's Jet, however, it did not state which member he is. It is believed that he is Eugene De La Hot Croix Bun.

On 28 March 2007, a Myspace page opened for a Melbourne band called Root! which the lead singer claimed to be "the friend of the uncle of the guys in Jet". The page also lists James Paull as a "friend". Humphrey B. Flaubert's real name is Damian Cowell, who performed in the band as D.C. Root.

== Style ==
TISM are distinguished from other "joke" or "gimmick" bands by, among other things, their musical style. The band rarely, in any seriousness, state actual influences on the type of music they played, except that The Residents were a band which TISM "did" notice and "possibly" took some influence from. A clear link can be drawn from The Residents' 1977 promotional video The Third Reich 'n' Roll, in which that group wore Ku Klux Klan uniforms made of newspapers (TISM did exactly this at their first gig). Other bands which may have influenced TISM are difficult to pinpoint, although a Sydney Morning Herald article on the band described them as "a cross between Skyhooks, Dave Warner, Talking Heads and The Residents".

In 2021, co-founder Humphrey B. Flaubert noted that part of the band's style was "never breaking out of character. Whether that character was 99% the real us, it was still a character. Listen to any interview and you'll get the sense that those guys are constantly 'on'. The persona never wanes. The metaphorical mask never drops. And while that may have annoyed some journalists, it's what set that band apart from every other band. It's what made that band's interviews more interesting for the listener than fucking Joe Blow going on about the creative inspiration behind his new album."

Recurring lyrical themes are present throughout TISM's catalog, the most common being death, violence, fame and prominent figures, drugs, including alcohol, and the Australian Football League. Many of TISM's lyrics are tinged in fatalism, mocking both the superficial and the sublime side of the human condition and the desire for people to be loved and respected (even just in the titles of such songs as "If You're Not Famous at Fourteen, You're Finished", "If You're Ugly, Forget It" and "Everyone Else Has Had More Sex Than Me").

TISM's early keyboard sound was provided by an Optigan which keyboardist Eugene de la Hot-Croix Bun ran through a flanger. They mainly use standard tuning; however, Eb tuning and drop D were employed in some songs. Jock Cheese's bass is prominent in the songs to a degree that head of Festival Mushroom Records, Michael Parisi, described the sound as "aggressive".

The band were sometimes criticised as unoriginal for continually opting for standard pop song structures. One reason for this is clarified in their book, The TISM Guide To Little Aesthetics, in the following paragraphs, when asked why their ideas are post-modern but their music is not:

"Give me a pop-song, mate. Give me a fucking pop-song. Not only is it more fun, it's pretty fuckin' hard to write as well. You can bung in as many out-of-tune oboes as you want, but putting chords together so they sound pleasant isn't as simple as it might appear. It mightn't be the Sistine Chapel, but what is? Ollie fucking Olsen with his stupid feedback and cough mixture? The Jesus and Mary Chain, with their stupid feedback, and their stupid stage show with 800 powerful stupid lights and enough stupid dry ice to enhance their stupid stupidity up its own bullshit crappy teenage pretentious one dimensional dick witted puissant artistic enigma?

So ... what have you listened to for a good time that isn't, after all, a 'traditional' song? Still playing the Mike Oldfield records, huh? Still whipping Yessongs on for a good time? Wanna count on one hand how many people have fun at a Sonic Youth gig? I'm not supporting The Choirboys, old man, I'm just saying that the day some jumped-up over-paid self-important post-modernist cocksucker puts his foot upon his Fairlight computer in the middle of his 47-minute opus "The Silent Forgiveness of the Pig-God" and belts out the chords to "Johnny B. Goode" is the day I'll join you at the footlights of post-modernism.

Besides which, pop songs sell more."

== Discography ==
=== Studio albums ===
- Great Truckin' Songs of the Renaissance (1988)
- Hot Dogma (1990)
- Machiavelli and the Four Seasons (1995)
- www.tism.wanker.com (1998)
- De RigueurMortis (2001)
- The White Albun (2004)
- Death to Art (2024)

== Bibliography ==
=== Books ===
- The TISM Guide to Little Aesthetics (Stock, Aristotle and Waterman; 1990)
- TISM's Machiavelli and the Four Seasons (Tyler Jenke, Bloomsbury Academic; 2025)

=== Comics ===
- TISM #1 (Aaargh! Comics; May 1995)
- TISM #2 (Aaargh! Comics; January 1996)

== Awards and nominations ==
=== APRA Music Awards ===
The APRA Music Awards were established by Australasian Performing Right Association (APRA) in 1982 to honour the achievements of songwriters and music composers, and to recognise their song writing skills, sales and airplay performance, by its members annually.

Year	Nominee / work	Award	Result	Ref.
2025	"Death to Art"	Song of the Year	Shortlisted	

=== ARIA Music Awards ===
The ARIA Music Awards are a set of annual ceremonies presented by Australian Recording Industry Association (ARIA), which recognise excellence, innovation, and achievement across all genres of the music of Australia. They commenced in 1987.

Year	Nominee / work	Award	Result	Ref.
1989	"I'm Interested in Apathy"	Best Independent Release	Won	
1993	Beasts of Suburban	Best Independent Release	Nominated	
1993	Tony Cohen for TISM – "Get Thee to a Nunnery"	Producer of the Year	Nominated	
1995	Machiavelli and the Four Seasons	Best Independent Release	Won	
1996	"Greg! The Stop Sign!!"	Best Independent Release	Nominated	
1998	www.tism.wanker.com	Best Independent Release	Nominated	

=== The Age EG Awards ===
The Age EG Awards are an annual awards night celebrating Victorian music. They commenced in 2005.

Year	Nominee / work	Award	Result	Ref.
2006	TISM	Hall of Fame	inductee	

== Notes ==
^note TISM promoted themselves under various aliases, often for one-off events, including: The Frank Vitkovic Jazz Quartet; Machiavelli and the Four Seasons; Late for Breakfast; Jesus Education Salvation Uniform Squad; Open Mic Tryouts; Banjo Paterson-Lakes; Rex Oedipus; Jack 'Elephant' Titus; Herb Alpert And The Tijuana Brass; Dua Lipasuction; TSIM
