= The Beasts of Suburban =

EP by TISM
- Released: July 1992
- Recorded: March–April 1992
- Studio: Atlantis Studios, Port Lincoln, Australia
- Genre: Alternative rock
- Length: 31:43
- Label: Shock
- Producer: Tony Cohen

TISM chronology
Gentlemen, Start Your Egos (1991)	The Beasts of Suburban (1992)	Australia the Lucky Cunt (1993)

The Beasts of Suburban is an extended play (EP) by Australian alternative rock band, TISM. It was produced by Tony Cohen and released in July 1992 via Shock Records. Its title is a pun on the name of fellow Australian band, Beasts of Bourbon (also produced by Cohen). At the ARIA Music Awards of 1993, the album was nominated for Best Independent Release while Cohen was nominated for Producer of the Year for his work on the Cruel Sea's album This Is Not the Way Home and TISM's track, "Get Thee to a Nunnery".

On 10 November 2023, the album was reissued as a 3-disc boxset, containing a double CD with over 50 unreleased demo recordings made by the band between 1991 and 1992, as well as the four iTunes bonus tracks for the first time on a physical release. The reissue hit No. 2 on the Australian independent album charts.

== Reception ==
Tyler Jenke of Beat reviewed The Beasts of Suburban in his overview of TISM's career in June 2022, stating that the band had "returned to their pub-rock roots" with the seven-track EP. He noticed that they were "far more comfortable with the music they were making."

Australian feminist groups criticised TISM's sexism in their use of Sophie Lee in "Get Thee to a Nunnery". The song allegedly protests the use of sex to sell a product via Lee's appointment as the host of the TV series Sex in 1992, contrasted with her presenting the Nine Network's cartoon show, Looney Tunes in 1990. Karen Fletcher of Green Left Weekly described the latter appointment, "middle-aged men... rush home from work in time to watch Sophie throw to Bugs Bunny cartoons." Lee described TISM's song as "a boring song by a boring bunch of bourgeois boys."

In 2015 ToneDeaf's Corey Tonkin listed "Mourningtown Ride" as one of the 10 Greatest Songs About Melbourne.

== Track listings ==
On the cassette version, the same program is repeated on both sides of the tape.

The Beasts of Suburban
No.	Title	Length
1.	"Michael Jackson's Conveyor Belt"	3:04
2.	"Bishop = Handjob"	2:25
3.	"Get Thee to a Nunnery"	2:41
4.	"Father and Son"	2:29
5.	"Lillee Caught Dilley Bowled Milli Vanilli"	2:41
6.	"If You're Ugly, Forget It"	3:41
7.	"Mourningtown Ride"	10:51
8.	"Losers"	3:55
Total length:		31:43

- Note: "Mourningtown Ride" has a length of 3:48 followed by a short interview and 5:00 of silence.

=== Reissues ===
Expanded version.

The Beasts of Suburban (1997 reissue)
No.	Title	Length
1.	"Michael Jackson's Conveyor Belt"	3:03
2.	"Bishop = Handjob"	2:24
3.	"Get Thee to a Nunnery"	2:41
4.	"Father and Son"	2:29
5.	"Lillee Caught Dilley Bowled Milli Vanilli"	2:41
6.	"If You're Ugly, Forget It"	3:49
7.	"Mourningtown Ride" (Followed by a short interview and list of credits)	5:52
8.	"Lose Your Delusion I"	3:48
9.	"Jesus Pots the White Ball"	4:07
10.	"Mr. Ches Baragwanath, State Auditor-General"	3:52
11.	"Never Mind the Bollocks, Here's The House of Representatives"	2:41
12.	"Recorded By JJJ, 24-1-93, Melbourne Showgrounds" (Followed by 5 minutes of silence, then "Losers")	11:53
Total length:		49:06

Digital bonus tracks (2009)
No.	Title	Length
13.	"The Lead Singer of the Pogues Is Gonna Die" (From the rehearsal tapes)	3:56
14.	"Subliminal Satanic Message" (From the rehearsal tapes)	2:44
15.	"Consumption Tax" (From the rehearsal tapes)	4:08
16.	"Aussiemandias" (From the rehearsal tapes)	2:48

== Charts ==
Chart (1992–2023)	Peak position
Australian Albums (ARIA)	132
Australian Independent Albums (AIR)	2
Australian Independent Label Albums (AIR)	4

== Release history ==
Region	Date	Format(s)	Edition	Label	Catalogue
Australia	July 1992	CD; Cassette	Standard	Shock Records	SHOCK CD0022 / SHOCK MC0022
Australia	June 1997	CD; Cassette	Re-issue	Shock Records	SHOCKCD0022
Australia	October 2009	digital download	Re-issue	Genre B.Goode	—N/a
Australia	November 2023	CD; LP	Re-issue	Genre B.Goode	GBG0032 (single LP) / GBG0033 (4-LP boxset) / GBG0034 (CD boxset)
