= Peter Minack =

- Born: Peter Carl Minack; 1961 or 1962 (age 64–65); Melbourne, Victoria, Australia
- Genre: Alternative rock
- Instrument: Vocals
- Years active: 1970s–2004, 2022–present
- Writing career
- Occupations: Writer, teacher
- Genre: Historical novel
- Subject: American Civil War
- Notable work: C.W.G.

Peter Carl Minack (born in 1961 or 1962) is an Australian vocalist and teacher. He is known by his stage name Ron Hitler-Barassi as the vocalist for the alternative rock band TISM, initially active from 1984 to 2004. Under his own name he published an American Civil War novel, C.W.G. (or Campaigning with Grant) in 2000. While a member of TISM, Minack periodically worked as a secondary school teacher of Drama and fully resumed that role after they disbanded. In 2022, TISM reformed.

== Biography ==
Minack was born to a German father and Irish Australian mother in Richmond in 1961 or 1962.

In 1983, he joined TISM, an alternative rock band formed by two of his friends, Damian Cowell and Eugene Cester, in the year before. TISM members remained anonymous throughout their career, with Minack adopting his stage name, Ron Hitler-Barassi, as a reference to Adolf Hitler and Australian rules football fandom.

In 2000 he published a historical novel set in the American Civil War, Campaigning with Grant (or C.W.G). Michelle Griffin of The Age reviewed it as "anarchic and anachronistic" with a "sour satiric tone" where leaders of the conflict are cast as "civil war dickheads" to be "frequently lampooned throughout." The Weekend Australian's Stephen Matchett described it as "a terrific book that deserved the critical admiration it received."

TISM split up at the end of 2004 and Minack returned to his day job as a secondary school teacher of English in Melbourne.

In 2022, TISM reformed, to play three shows at the Goodthings festival, and 3 secret shows around Melbourne. Minack appeared on multiple radio interviews along with Damian Cowell across Melbourne, and one interview on ABC Sydney with Sarah Macdonald.

Minack is the younger brother of economist and ABC economics analyst Gerard Minack, who is described by the Australian Financial Review as a “veteran global macro strategist”. Minack is the cousin of Damien Carrick, who presents the Law Report on ABC Radio National. Minack’s Uncle is former Richmond footballer, Bill Carrick.
