= List of songs banned by the BBC =

This article lists songs and whole discographies that have been banned by the British Broadcasting Corporation (BBC) over the years. During its history, the corporation has banned songs from a number of high-profile artists, including the BBC Dance Orchestra, the Beatles, Noël Coward, Bing Crosby, Ken Dodd, George Formby, Tom Lehrer, Glenn Miller, Elvis Presley, Cliff Richard, and Frank Sinatra. Some songs were banned for only a limited period, and have since received BBC airplay, while others were banned many years after first being aired, as was the case of the Cure's "Killing an Arab", ABBA's "Waterloo", Queen's "Killer Queen", the Boomtown Rats' "I Don't Like Mondays" and 67 other songs which were banned from BBC airplay as the first Gulf War began. Judge Dread, known for frequent use of sexual innuendo and double entendres, had all of his 11 singles that entered the UK Singles Chart banned by the BBC, which is the most for any one artist.

== History ==
On occasion the BBC has seen fit to prevent certain pieces of music from being broadcast if it was felt that these recordings were unsuitable for the British public. Files in the BBC's Written Archives Centre in Caversham, Berkshire that are now available for public inspection show that the Dance Music Policy Committee, set up in the 1930s, took its role as Britain's cultural guardian seriously: one 1942 directive read:

We have recently adopted a policy of excluding sickly sentimentality which, particularly when sung by certain vocalists, can become nauseating and not at all in keeping with what we feel to be the need of the public in this country in the fourth year of war.

The BBC's director of music, Sir Arthur Bliss, wrote instructions during World War II advising the committee to ban songs "which are slushy in sentiment" or "pop" versions of classical pieces, such as "I'm Always Chasing Rainbows" from the 1918 Broadway show Oh, Look!, which made use of Frédéric Chopin's Fantaisie-Impromptu. Other songs based on Classical music themes that were later banned by the committee due to "distortion of melody, harmony and rhythm" were the Cougars' 1963 single "Saturday Nite at the Duck-Pond", which used music from Swan Lake, and "Baubles, Bangles and Beads", from the 1953 musical Kismet, which was based on the second movement of Alexander Borodin's String Quartet in D.

Other justifications for such bans have included the use of foul language in lyrics, explicit sexual content, alleged drug references, and controversial political subject matter. Don Cornell's 1954 song "Hold My Hand" was banned from airplay due to religious references. Bob Dylan's song "Baby, Let Me Follow You Down" was banned in 1962, as it included the phrase, "God-almighty world". Satire was another possible reason for banning: in 1953, ten of the twelve tracks on humorist Tom Lehrer's album Songs by Tom Lehrer were banned. In February 1956, the British music magazine NME reported that the theme for the film The Man with the Golden Arm, recorded by Eddie Calvert, was also banned. Despite the song being an instrumental, a BBC spokesman reported: "The ban is due to its connection with a film about drugs." Billy May's version, retitled "Main Theme", was approved for transmission.

In certain cases, appeals to the BBC in favour of banning a song have failed or have only been partial. In 1972, Christian morality campaigner Mary Whitehouse failed in her campaign to stop the BBC from playing Chuck Berry's "My Ding-a-Ling", and featuring Alice Cooper's "School's Out" on Top of the Pops. In the case of Orchestral Manoeuvres in the Dark's 1980 anti-war song "Enola Gay", a ban was applied only to its airing on the BBC's children's programming, as some within the organisation perceived the word "gay" as a corrupting sexual influence. Occasionally, a ban has first been imposed by an individual DJ refusing to play a particular song; in January 1984, Radio 1's Mike Read refused to play Frankie Goes to Hollywood's "Relax" on his mid-morning show, declaring it "overtly obscene", a decision which the BBC then followed.

In 1997, "Smack My Bitch Up" by the Prodigy was banned due to controversy regarding its lyrics, "change my pitch up, smack my bitch up", which prompted criticism from feminist groups. At the time, the BBC was attempting to shed its old-fashioned image and embrace dance culture, but at the same time they were concerned about broadcasting a song that was believed by some to be about physically assaulting women. In the end, the corporation decided to restrict the song's airplay to a minimum and generally used an instrumental remix version whenever they did play it.

The Broadcasting Standards Council has also made rulings about whether songs played by the BBC were offensive or indecent. In 1992, they ruled that the song "Ebeneezer Goode" by the Shamen should not have been broadcast by the programme Top of the Pops because it encouraged drug use. In 1994, they upheld another complaint against Radio One for playing the Radiohead song "Creep", which includes the word "fuck", during the daytime.

Since the early 2000s, the BBC has claimed that it no longer bans any records. However, cases of direct or indirect censorship have occurred; according to a BBC spokesperson, no official ban was imposed in the case of Linda McCartney's posthumous "The Light Comes from Within", despite her widower Paul McCartney running advertisements in the national press criticising a supposed ban. While the bans on some songs have been lifted, other songs have never been officially cleared for airing on BBC radio, and their status is uncertain – in some cases, records which had been banned have since been played on BBC radio without any official announcement that the ban has ended, such as the Beatles' "A Day in the Life". BBC Radio 1 banned the full version of the Pogues' "Fairytale of New York" in 2007, replacing it with an edited version; however, the ban was quickly lifted due to public outcry.

== Censored versus banned ==
In some cases, it was considered sufficient to censor certain words, rather than banning a song outright. In the case of the Kinks' song "Lola", the BBC's strict ban on advertising led to singer and songwriter Ray Davies replacing the brand name "Coca-Cola" with "cherry cola" in the lyrics prior to the release of the record to avoid a possible ban. In other cases, it was not necessary for the BBC to formally ban a particular song, since both parties were well aware of what would be acceptable or not, as was the case of George Formby's 1937 song "With My Little Stick of Blackpool Rock".

In the case of songs that the BBC deemed politically controversial, many were not banned outright and were instead placed on a "restricted" list, in order that they not be used in "general entertainment programmes". Some of Bob Dylan's early 1960s protest songs were put on this list and so too was Barry McGuire's 1965 hit, "Eve of Destruction".

After the death of former British prime minister Margaret Thatcher on 8 April 2013, anti-Thatcher sentiment prompted campaigns on social media platforms which resulted in the song "Ding-Dong! The Witch Is Dead" reaching number 2 on the UK Singles Chart. On 12 April, Radio 1 controller Ben Cooper said that the station's chart show would not play the song in the usual format, but that a short snippet would be aired as part of a news item.

== List of banned songs ==
The following is a list of songs which have been banned by the BBC over the years. Some were banned from particular shows (e.g., children's programming), while others were banned for a limited period, and have since received BBC airplay. In some cases, more information about the banned songs can be found in their respective articles.

As the first Gulf War began, the BBC deemed several songs inappropriate for airplay in light of the situation and subsequently banned them from their radio stations for the duration of the war. A list of 67 banned songs was published by New Statesman and Society in conjunction with British public-service television broadcaster Channel 4. These songs have this icon against them.

=== 0–9 ===
- "5th Anniversary EP" – Judge Dread (1977) (Note: Judge Dread "made 11 records of innuendo set to reggae, all banned by the BBC, a record." Judge Dread "holds the record for having the most songs banned by the BBC, 11 in all, which incidentally is precisely the number of singles he placed on the charts". The 11 records that entered the UK Singles Chart were, "Big Six", "Big Seven", "Big Eight", "Je t'aime... moi non plus", "Big Ten", "Christmas in Dreadland", "The Winkle Man", "Y Viva Suspenders", "5th Anniversary EP", "Up With the Cock!/Big Punk", "Jingle Bells/Hokey Cokey" and "Relax".)

=== A ===
- "Act of War" – Elton John and Millie Jackson (1985)
- "A-huggin' and A-chalkin'" – Johnny Mercer (1946)
- "All the Young Dudes" – Mott the Hoople (1972)
- "Angels in the Sky" – The Crew-Cuts (1955)
- "Answer Me" – Frankie Laine (1953)
- "Armed and Extremely Dangerous" – First Choice (1973)
- "Army Dreamers" – Kate Bush (1980)
- "Atomic" – Blondie (1980)

=== B ===
- "Baby, Let Me Follow You Down" – Bob Dylan (1962)
- "Back in the U.S.S.R." – The Beatles (1968)
- "Ball of Confusion (That's What the World Is Today)" – The Temptations (1970)
- "Bang Bang" – BA Robertson (1979)
- "Bang Bang (My Baby Shot Me Down)" – Cher (1966)
- "The Battle of New Orleans" – Johnny Horton (1959)
- "Baubles, Bangles and Beads" – Kirby Stone Four (1958)
- "Be Prepared" – Tom Lehrer (1953)
- "Beep Beep" – The Playmates (1958)
- "Bewitched, Bothered and Bewildered" – Ella Fitzgerald (1958)
- "Big Eight" – Judge Dread (1973)
- "Big Seven" – Judge Dread (1972)
- "Big Six" – Judge Dread (1972)
- "Big Ten" – Judge Dread (1975)
- "Billy Don't Be a Hero" – Paper Lace (1974)
- "The Blue Danube" – Spike Jones and His City Slickers (1945)
- "Boom Bang-a-Bang" – Lulu (1969)
- "Boris Johnson Is a Fucking Cunt" – The Kunts (2020)
- "Boris Johnson Is Still a Fucking Cunt" – The Kunts (2021)
- "Brothers in Arms" – Dire Straits (1985)
- "Buffalo Soldier" – Bob Marley and the Wailers (1983)
- "Burn My Candle" – Shirley Bassey (1956)
- "Burning Bridges" – Status Quo (1988)

=== C ===
- "(Celebrate) The Day After You" – The Blow Monkeys and Curtis Mayfield (1987)
- "Celebrate the Bullet" – The Selecter (1981)
- "Chaabian Boyz" – Frenzo Harami (2019)
- "Charlie Brown" – The Coasters (1959)
- "The Christening" – Arthur Askey (1943)
- "Christmas in Dreadland" – Judge Dread (1975)
- "Come Again" – Au Pairs (1981)
- "Come Monday" – Jimmy Buffett (1974)
- "Come Together" – The Beatles (1969)
- "The Cover of Rolling Stone" – Dr. Hook & the Medicine Show (1973)
- "Cradle Song (Brahms' Lullaby)" – Frank Sinatra (1944)
- "Creep" – Radiohead (1992)
- "Croce di Oro (Cross of Gold)" – Joan Regan (1955)
- "Crying in the Chapel" – Lee Lawrence (1953)
- "Cuddle Me" – Ted Heath featuring Dennis Lotis (1954)

=== D ===
- "Danny Boy" – Conway Twitty (1959)
- "A Day in the Life" – The Beatles (1967)
- "The Deck of Cards" – T. Texas Tyler (1948)
- "Deep in the Heart of Texas" – Bing Crosby and Woody Herman (1942)
- "The Devil Is a Woman" – Herb Jeffries (1957)
- "Diggin' My Potatoes" – Lonnie Donegan (1954)
- "Dinner with Drac" – John Zacherle (1958)
- "Don't Let's Be Beastly to the Germans" – Noël Coward (1943)
- "Disarm" – The Smashing Pumpkins (1994)

=== E ===
- "Ebeneezer Goode" – The Shamen (1992)
- "Ebony Eyes" – The Everly Brothers (1961)
- "The End of the World" – Skeeter Davis (1962)
- "Enola Gay" – Orchestral Manoeuvres in the Dark
- "Eve of Destruction" – Barry McGuire (1965) (Note: "Eve of Destruction" was not banned outright, but was placed on a "restricted" list which meant it was not used in "general entertainment programmes".)
- "Everybody Wants to Rule the World" – Tears for Fears (1985)

=== F ===
- "Fields of Fire" – Big Country (1982)
- "Fire" – The Crazy World of Arthur Brown (1968)
- "Flash" – Queen (1980)
- "The Foggy, Foggy, Dew" – Peter Pears (1950)
- "Fools Rush In" – Ricky Nelson (1963)
- "Forget Me Not" – Martha and the Vandellas (1968)
- "Freezing This Christmas" – Sir Starmer and the Granny Harmers (2024)
- "French Kiss" – Lil Louis (1989)
- "Fucking in Heaven" – Fatboy Slim (1998)
- "Fuck the Tories" – The Kunts (2022)

=== G ===
- "The Garden of Eden" – Frankie Vaughan (1957)
- "Ghost Town" – The Specials (1981)
- "Gimme a Pigfoot (And a Bottle of Beer)" – Bessie Smith (1933)
- "Gimme Hope Jo'anna" – Eddy Grant (1988)
- "Give Ireland Back to the Irish" – Wings (1972)
- "Give Peace a Chance" – Plastic Ono Band (1969)
- "Glad to Be Gay" – Tom Robinson Band (1978)
- "Gloomy Sunday" – Billie Holiday (1941)
- "God Bless the Child" – Billie Holiday (1942)
- "God Save the Queen" – Sex Pistols (1977)
- "Green Jeans" – The Flee-Rekkers (1960)
- "Granny Takes a Trip" – Purple Gang (1967)
- "Greensleeves" – The Beverley Sisters (1956)
- "Guess Things Happen That Way" – Johnny Cash (1958)

=== H ===
- "Hank Janson Blues" – Anne Shelton (1953)
- "Have a Whiff on Me" – Mungo Jerry (1971)
- "Happiness Is a Warm Gun" – The Beatles (1968)
- "Hard Headed Woman" – Elvis Presley (1958)
- "He" – Al Hibbler (1955)
- "Heaven and Hell" – The Easybeats (1967)
- "Heaven Help Us All" – Stevie Wonder (1979)
- "The Heel" – Eartha Kitt (1955)
- "Hi, Hi, Hi" – Wings (1972)
- "High Class Baby" – Cliff Richard and the Drifters (1958)
- "Hold My Hand" – Don Cornell (1954)
- "Honey Hush" – The Rock and Roll Trio (1956)
- "Honey Love" – Dennis Lotis (1954)
- "Honeycomb" – Jimmie Rodgers (1957)
- "(How Little It Matters) How Little We Know" – Frank Sinatra (1956)
- "The House of the Rising Sun" – Josh White (1950)
- "Hunting High and Low" – A-ha (1985)
- "Hype on the Mic" – Frenzo Harami (2019)

=== I ===
- "I Am the Walrus" – The Beatles (1967) (Note: Contrary to a number of other sources, author Martin Cloonan has claimed that, in fact, only one Beatles song was ever banned by the BBC – "A Day in the Life" from the album Sgt. Pepper's Lonely Hearts Club Band.)
- "I Can't Control Myself" – The Troggs (1966)
- "I Can't Make It" – Small Faces (1967)
- "I Don't Like Mondays" – The Boomtown Rats (1979)
- "I Don't Want to Be a Hero" – Johnny Hates Jazz (1987)
- "I Hear the Angels Singing" – Frankie Laine (1954)
- "(I Just) Died in Your Arms" – Cutting Crew (1986)
- "I Leaned on a Man" – Connie Francis (1957)
- "I Love a Man in Uniform" – Gang of Four (1982)
- "I Want to Be Evil" – Eartha Kitt (1953)
- "I Want You to Be My Baby" – Annie Ross (1956)
- "I Want Your Sex" – George Michael (1987)
- "I Went to Your Wedding" – Spike Jones and His City Slickers (1953)
- "I'll Be Home for Christmas" – Bing Crosby (1943)
- "I'll Fly for You" – Spandau Ballet (1984)
- "I'm Always Chasing Rainbows" – Ken Dodd (1963)
- "I'm Always Chasing Rainbows" – Perry Como (1949)
- "I'm Gonna Get Me a Gun" – Cat Stevens (1967)
- "I'm Nobody's Baby" – Frankie Howerd (1948)
- "I'm on Fire" – Bruce Springsteen (1984)
- "Imagine" – John Lennon (1971)
- "I Shot the Sheriff" – Eric Clapton (1974)
- "In the Air Tonight" – Phil Collins (1981)
- "In the Army Now" – Status Quo (1986)
- "In the Beginning" – Frankie Laine (1955)
- "In the Hall of the Mountain King" – Nero and the Gladiators (1961)
- "Invisible Sun" – The Police (1981)
- "Israelites" – Desmond Dekker & the Aces (1968)
- "It Is No Secret" – Jo Stafford (1954)
- "It Wasn't God Who Made Honky Tonk Angels" – Kitty Wells (1952)
- "It Would Be So Nice" – Pink Floyd (1968)
- "I've Come of Age" – Billy Storm (1959)
- "I Will Survive" – Arrival (1980)

=== J ===
- "Jack the Ripper" – Screaming Lord Sutch (1963)
- "Jackie" – Scott Walker (1967)
- "Jerusalem" – Emerson, Lake & Palmer (1973)
- "Je t'aime... moi non plus" – Jane Birkin and Serge Gainsbourg (1969)
- "Je t'aime... moi non plus" – Judge Dread
- "Jingle Bells/Hokey Cokey" – Judge Dread (1978)
- "John and Marsha" – Stan Freberg (1950)
- "Johnny Remember Me" – John Leyton (1961)
- "Jungle Fever" – The Chakachas (1971)

=== K ===
- "Kant" – Miriana Conte (2025)
- "Keep Me in Mind" – Lita Roza and Al Timothy (1955)
- "Killer Queen" – Queen (1974)
- "Killing an Arab" – The Cure (1979)
- "Killing Me Softly with His Song" – Roberta Flack (1973)
- "Kodachrome" – Paul Simon (1973)

=== L ===
- "Landing of the Daleks" – The Earthlings (1965)
- "La Petite Tonkinoise" – Josephine Baker (1930)
- "Lazy Mary" – Lou Monte (1958)
- "Leader of the Pack" – The Shangri-Las (1964)
- "Let the People Go" – McGuinness Flint (1972)
- "Let's Spend the Night Together" – The Rolling Stones (1967)
- "Light a Candle in the Chapel" – Frank Sinatra (1942)
- "Light My Fire" – José Feliciano (1968)
- "Lili Marleen" – Lale Andersen (1939)
- "A Little Peace" – Nicole (1982)
- "Little Star" – The Elegants (1958)
- "Living on the Front Line" – Eddy Grant (1979)
- "Lola" – The Kinks (1970)
- "Love for Sale" – Cole Porter (1930)
- "Love for Sale" – Ella Fitzgerald (1956)
- "Love Is" – Alma Cogan (1958)
- "Love Is a Battlefield" – Pat Benatar (1983)
- "Love Is Strange" – Mickey & Sylvia (1956)
- "Love to Love You Baby" – Donna Summer (1975)
- "Lovin' Machine" – Wynonie Harris (1951)
- "Lucy in the Sky with Diamonds" – The Beatles (1967)

=== M ===
- "Mack the Knife" – Bobby Darin (1959)
- "Made You" – Adam Faith (1960)
- "Maggie May" – The Vipers Skiffle Group (1957)
- "Magic Roundabout" – Jasper Carrott (1975)
- "The Man with the Golden Arm" – Eddie Calvert (1956)
- "Maybellene" – Chuck Berry (1955)
- "Midnight at the Oasis" – Maria Muldaur (1974)
- "Mighty Mighty Man" – Bobby Darin (1958)
- "Minnie the Moocher" – Cab Calloway (1931)
- "Miss You" – Bing Crosby (1942)
- "Mix-A-Fix" – Haydock's Rockhouse (1967)
- "The Mocking Bird" – The Four Lads (1958)
- "Monster Mash" – Bobby "Boris" Pickett and the Crypt-Kickers (1962)
- "Moonlight Love" – Perry Como (1956)
- "My Christmas Prayer" – Billy Fury (1959)
- "My Friend" – Eddie Fisher (1954)
- "My Friend Jack" – The Smoke (1967)
- "My Generation" – The Who (1965)
- "My Little Ukulele" – Joe Brown and The Bruvvers (1963)

=== N ===
- "Night of the Long Grass" – The Troggs (1967)
- "Night of the Vampire" – The Moontrekkers (1961)
- "The Night They Drove Old Dixie Down" – Joan Baez (1971)
- "Ninety-Nine Years (Dead or Alive)" – Guy Mitchell (1956)
- "Nobody Loves Like an Irishman" – Lonnie Donegan (1958)

=== O ===
- "Oh Bondage Up Yours!" – X-Ray Spex (1977)
- "The Old Dope Peddler" – Tom Lehrer (1953)
- "Old Man Atom" – The Sons of the Pioneers (1950)
- "Oliver's Army" – Elvis Costello (1979)
- "One Has My Name (The Other Has My Heart)" – Jimmy Wakely (1948)
- "Open Your Box" – Yoko Ono and the Plastic Ono Band (1971)
- "Over the Wall We Go" – Oscar (1967)

=== P ===
- "Paper Doll" – The Mills Brothers (1943)
- "Pass It Around" – Smokie (1975)
- "Peaceful Street" – Ernest Butcher (1936)
- "Peaches" – The Stranglers (1977)
- "Please No Squeeza da Banana" – Louis Prima (1945)
- "Prince Andrew Is a Sweaty Nonce" – The Kunts (2022)

=== R ===
- "Radio Times" – BBC Dance Orchestra (1935)
- "The Reefer Song (If You're a Viper)" – Fats Waller (1943)
- "Relax" – Frankie Goes to Hollywood (1984)
- "Relax" – Judge Dread (1984)
- "Respectable Street" – XTC (1981)
- "Rock You Sinners" – Art Baxter and His Rock 'n' Roll Sinners (1958)
- "A Rose and a Baby Ruth" – George Hamilton IV (1956)
- "Rubber Bullets" – 10cc (1973)
- "Ruby, Don't Take Your Love to Town" – Kenny Rogers and The First Edition (1969)
- "Rum and Coca-Cola" – The Andrews Sisters (1945)
- "A Russian Love Song" – The Goons (1957)

=== S ===
- "The Sabre Dance" – Woody Herman (1948)
- "Sad Affair" – Marxman (1993)
- "Sailing" – Rod Stewart (1972)
- "Saturday Night's Alright for Fighting" – Elton John (1973)
- "Saturday Nite at the Duckpond" – The Cougars (1963)
- "Say a Prayer for the Boys Over There" – Deanna Durbin (1943)
- "Send Me to the 'Lectric Chair" – George Melly (1953)
- "Sex & Drugs & Rock & Roll" – Ian Dury (1977)
- "The Shag (Is Totally Cool)" – Billy Graves (1958)
- "Shall We Take a Trip" – Northside (1990)
- "She Had to Go and Lose It at the Astor" – Johnny Messner (1939)
- "She Was Only a Postmaster's Daughter" – Durium Dance Band (1933)
- "Silent Running (On Dangerous Ground)" – Mike and the Mechanics (1985)
- "The Silver Madonna" – Kirk Stevens (1957)
- "Sincerely" – Liberace (1955)
- "Sink the Bismark – Johnny Horton (1960)
- "Six Months in a Leaky Boat" – Split Enz (1982) (banned during the Falklands War)
- "Sixty Eight Guns" – The Alarm (1983)
- "Sixty Minute Man" – The Dominoes (1951)
- "The Sky" – Petula Clark (1957)
- "Smack My Bitch Up" – The Prodigy (1997) (Note: An instrumental remix of "Smack My Bitch Up" did receive limited airplay)
- "Song of India" – Tommy Dorsey (1938)
- "So What?" – Anti-Nowhere League (1981)
- "Soldier" – Harvey Andrews (1972)
- "Soldier of Love" – Donny Osmond (1989)
- "Somebody Up There Likes Me" – Perry Como (1956)
- "A Souvenir of London" – Procol Harum (1973)
- "Space Oddity" – David Bowie (1969)
- "Spasticus Autisticus" – Ian Dury and the Blockheads (1981)
- "State of Independence" – Donna Summer (1982)
- "Statue of Liberty" – XTC (1978)
- "St. Therese of the Roses" – Malcolm Vaughan (1956)
- "Stop the Cavalry" – Jona Lewie (1980)
- "The Story of a Starry Night" – Glenn Miller (1943)
- "The Story of Three Loves" – Ray Martin (1954)
- "Stranger in Paradise" – The Four Aces (1953)
- "Such a Night" – Johnnie Ray (1954)
- "Suicide Is Painless" – M*A*S*H (1970)
- "Summer Smash" – Denim (1997)

=== T ===
- "Take Off Your Clothes" – Peter Sarstedt (1969)
- "Teen Angel" – Mark Dinning (1959)
- "Teen Age Prayer" – Gale Storm (1955)
- "Tell Laura I Love Her" – Ray Peterson (1960)
- "Tell Laura I Love Her" – Ricky Valance (1960)
- "Terry" – Twinkle (1964)
- "The Test of Time" – Robert Earl (1959)
- "A Theme from the Threepenny Orchestra (Mack the Knife)" – Louis Armstrong (1956)
- "Three Stars" – Ruby Wright (1959)
- "'Til the Following Night" – Screaming Lord Sutch (1961)
- "Till the End of Time" – Perry Como (1945)
- "Ting Tong Tang" – Ken Platt (1958)
- "To Keep My Love Alive" – Ella Fitzgerald (1956)
- "Toll the Bell Easy" – Les Hobeaux (1957)
- "The Tommy Rot Story" – Morris & Mitch (1957)
- "Tonight's the Night (Gonna Be Alright)" – Rod Stewart (1976)
- "Too Drunk to Fuck" – Dead Kennedys (1981)
- "Tribute to Buddy Holly" – Mike Berry and The Outlaws (1961)
- "Two Tribes" – Frankie Goes to Hollywood (1984)

=== U ===
- "The Unbeliever" – Guy Mitchell (1957)
- "Under Attack" – ABBA (1982)
- "Up With the Cock!/Big Punk" – Judge Dread (1978)
- "Urban Guerrilla" – Hawkwind (1973)

=== V ===
- "A View to a Kill" – Duran Duran (1985)
- "The Voice in My Heart" – Eydie Gormé (1958)

=== W ===
- "Walk Hand in Hand" – Tony Martin (1956)
- "Walk Like an Egyptian" – The Bangles (1986)
- "Walking on Water" – Eliza Doolittle (2013)
- "War" – Edwin Starr (1970)
- "War Baby" – Tom Robinson (1982)
- "Warpaint" – The Brook Brothers (1961)
- "Waterloo" – ABBA (1974)
- "We Call It Acieed" – D-Mob (1988)
- "We Can't Let You Broadcast That" – Norman Long (1932)
- "(We Don't Need This) Fascist Groove Thang" – Heaven 17 (1981)
- "We Gotta Get Out of This Place" – The Animals (1965)
- "We Have to Be So Careful" – The Beverley Sisters (1953)
- "We Will All Go Together When We Go" – Tom Lehrer (1959)
- "Wet Dream" – Max Romeo (1969)
- "What God Wants, Part I" – Roger Waters (1992)
- "When I'm Cleaning Windows" – George Formby (1936)
- "When I'm Dead and Gone" – McGuinness Flint (1970)
- "When the Going Gets Tough, the Tough Get Going" – Billy Ocean (1985)
- "When Your Lights Turned On" – The Hollies (1967)
- "Whoa Buck" – Lonnie Donegan (1959)
- The Winker's Song (Misprint) – Ivor Biggun (1978)
- "The Winkle Man" – Judge Dread (1976)
- "With My Little Stick of Blackpool Rock" – George Formby (1937)
- "With My Little Ukulele in My Hand" – George Formby (1933)
- "Woman Love" – Gene Vincent (1956)
- "A Worried Man" – The Kingston Trio (1959)

=== Y ===
- "Y Viva Suspenders" – Judge Dread (1976)
- "You'll Get Yours" – Frank Sinatra (1956)

== List of banned discographies ==
- Lostprophets' discography (from 2014–onwards)
- Alan Bush's discography (from March–June 1941)
- Ewan MacColl's discography (during World War II)
- Gary Glitter's discography (from 2014–onwards) (Note: Prior to 2014, the BBC had an informal ban on Glitter's music, with the corporation reportedly having a "Gary Glitter list" of banned artists. In 2012, the BBC showed a 1977 performance by Glitter on Top of the Pops and in 2014, BBC Radio 6 Music broadcast two minutes of Glitter's "Rock and Roll Part Two".)

== See also ==
- Clear Channel memorandum
- List of books banned by governments § United Kingdom
- Film censorship in the United Kingdom § List of banned films
- List of works rejected by the British Board of Film Classification
