= Wanker =

Insult

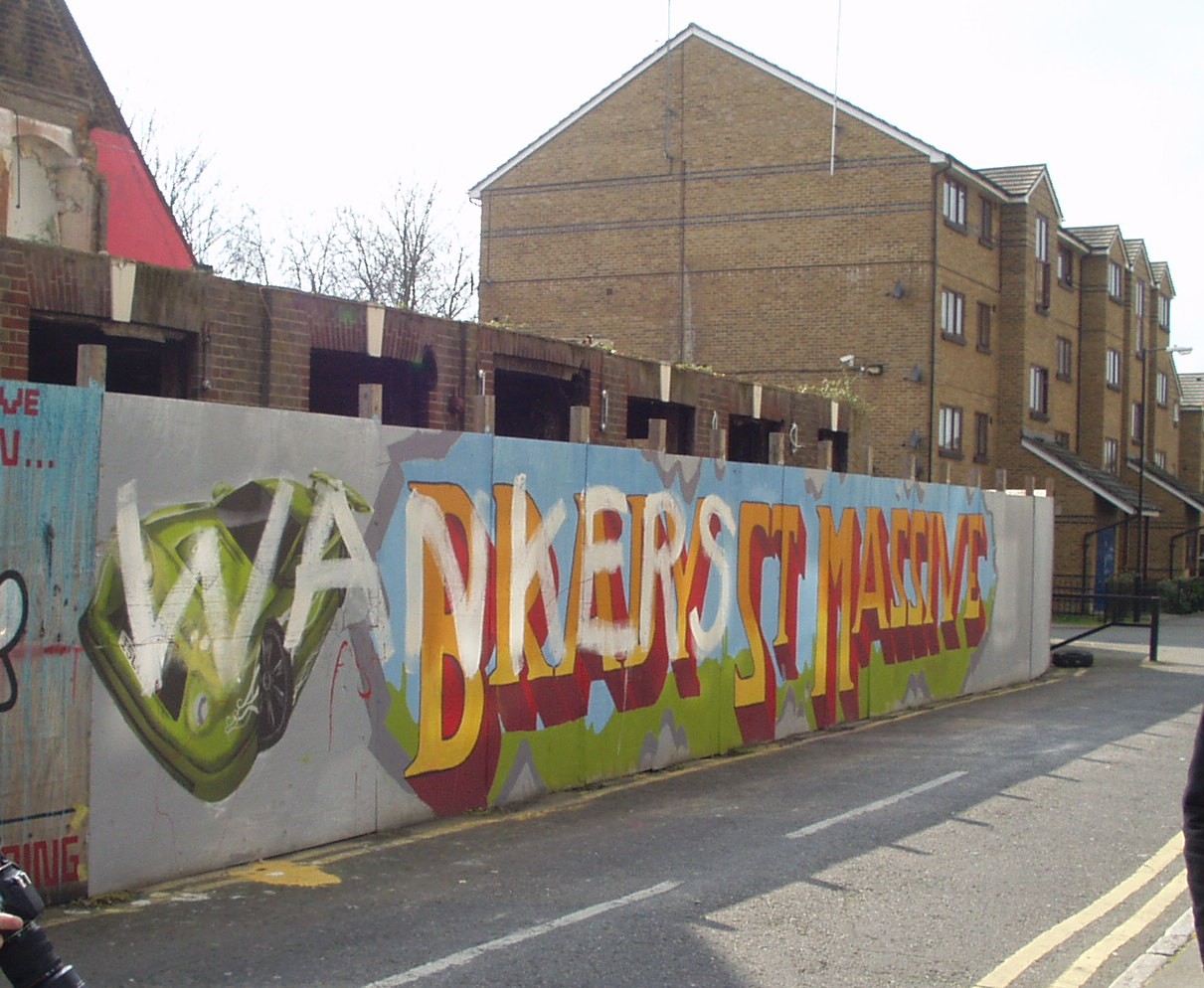
Graffiti calling a rival group "Wankers", in Bethnal Green, East London

Wanker is slang for "one who wanks (masturbates)", but is most often used as a general insult. It is a pejorative term of English origin common in Britain and other parts of the English-speaking world (mainly Commonwealth of Nations), including Ireland, Australia and New Zealand. It is synonymous with the insult tosser.

== Meaning ==
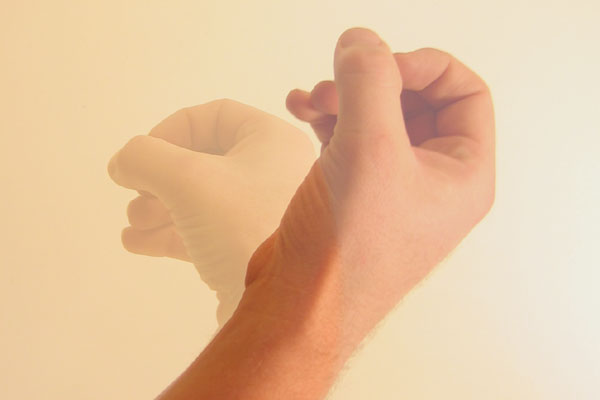
"Wanker" hand gesture

The terms wank and wanker originated in British slang during the late 19th and early 20th century. In modern usage, it is usually a general term of contempt rather than a commentary on sexual habits. Wanker has similar meanings and overtones to American pejoratives like jerk or jerk-off. More generally, wanker can carry suggestions of egotistical and self-indulgent behaviour and this is the dominant meaning in Australia and New Zealand.

Wanker may be indicated by a one-handed gesture, usually to an audience out of hearing range. It is performed by curling the fingers of the hand into a loose fist and moving the hand back and forth to mime male masturbation, which is equivalent to saying, "that person is a wanker".

The phrase "full-kit wanker" is sometimes used as an insult in English football culture to refer to fans who frequently wear full replica kits in public.

Related are terms such as "wanker's colic", for an undiagnosed visceral pain, and "wanker's doom", for excessive masturbation, from slang used in the RAF and British prisons since the 1920s.

== Differences in perceived levels of offensiveness ==
In December 2000, the Advertising Standards Authority published research on attitudes of the British public to pejoratives. It ranked wanker as the fourth most severe pejorative in English. The BBC describes it as "moderately offensive" and "almost certain" to generate complaints if used before the watershed.

In Australia, it is considered mildly offensive but is widely accepted and used in the media.

In the United States, the term is understood but rarely used. Mary Cresswell, an American etymologist, describes "wanker" as "somewhat more offensive in British use than Americans typically realize". The word was used twice to comic effect in The Simpsons episode "Trash of the Titans", which caused no offence to American audiences, but prompted complaints on occasions when the episode was broadcast unedited in the United Kingdom.

During a Fox pre-match show for the 2026 FIFA World Cup, American soccer player Alexi Lalas referred to British comedian James Corden (who was presenting a companion chat show throughout the tournament) as a "full-kit wanker", which he clarified as meaning "when he's all dressed up and ready to go". The remark was met with chagrin from his fellow panelists, including English presenter Rebecca Lowe—who noted that "wanker" was not considered as offensive on American television as it was in Britain.

== In popular culture ==
"The Winker's Song (Misprint)" by Ivor Biggun is one of many songs about masturbation. It describes the singer: "I'm a wanker, I'm a wanker. And it does me good like it bloody well should", and it reached number 22 in the 1978 UK charts. It was banned by BBC Radio 1 and every national radio and television service.

Phil Collins used the word in his 1984 cameo appearance on Miami Vice and has sometimes been credited with introducing the word to America.

In the film This Is Spinal Tap, David St. Hubbins and Nigel Tufnel both use the word out of earshot to describe fellow rock star Duke Fame after a chance encounter.

On the American television show Married... with Children, Peggy Bundy's maiden name is Wanker and her family is from the fictional Wanker County.

On the British television quiz show Countdown, contestants have to form the longest word possible from nine randomly selected letters. On one occasion, the letters permitted the spelling of "wanker" (or "wankers") and both contestants replied with the word, leading one to quip "we've got a pair of wankers". The sequence was edited out of the show (as is common with risqué words), but has been shown as an outtake on other shows. However, on a later occasion, "wanker" was offered, and this instance was left in and broadcast unedited.

During the New Zealand national cricket team's tours of Australia in the mid-1980s, Australian crowds extensively chanted "Hadlee's a wanker" while New Zealand fast bowler Richard Hadlee was bowling, supported by hand-written banners. The reference even continued after Hadlee had retired, including a "Hadlee's a wanker" banner appearing at an Australia v Croatia soccer game during the 2006 World Cup finals.

The comedy show Mork & Mindy featured a character named Mr. Wanker who was Mindy's landlord. This was broadcast on American TV and later British TV.

Australian band TISM released an album in 1998 entitled www.tism.wanker.com (which was an active website for a few months after its release). One of the themes in its lyrics is breaking down male society into two distinct cultures: Yobs (the subject of the first single released from the album) and wankers. Its third single, "Whatareya?", offers examples of differences between the types and tells the listener to decide which one he is.

Hard rock (formerly glam metal) band Vixen's 1998 album Tangerine contains a hidden instrumental track titled "Swatting Flies in Wanker County", written by then-member Gina Stile.

In February 2009, U2 member Bono called Chris Martin a wanker live on air during Jo Whiley's Radio 1 show.

During a live radio debate on 28 May 2010, the future President of Ireland, Michael D. Higgins, urged conservative American radio host Michael Graham to "be proud to be a decent American rather than being just a wanker whipping up fear."

When acting as the ombudsman on Red Eye w/Greg Gutfeld in 2011, Mike Baker presented a graph of the "wanker gap" for the first half of the program. Baker has never given an explanation of the meaning of the "wanker gap."

Jack Vance wrote a science fiction book entitled Servants of the Wankh in 1969. The title was changed to The Wannek due to its sounding like wank.

Iron Maiden's song "El Dorado" contains a veiled reference to the term in the line "I'm a clever banker's face, with just a letter out of place." In live performances, singer Bruce Dickinson would change to an explicit mention: "I'm a clever wanker's face, just a banker out of place."

In January 2015, the then Mayor of London Boris Johnson described British-born jihadists as "pornography-obsessed inadequates who only turn to radical Islam when they fail to make it with girls...They are literally wankers".

Cockney Wanker is a long running character in Viz, based on a stereotypical male Cockney.

Inspired by controversy about The White Stripes' 2003 song "Seven Nation Army" connected to Donald Trump's 2016 presidential campaign, the British composer Ben Comeau wrote, in the style of J. S. Bach, a four-part fugue on the riff of that song to the words "Donald Trump is a wanker."
