= Cactus (record label) =

British record label

Cactus was a UK record label that found most of its success with music from the reggae genre in the mid 1970s.

A subsidiary of Creole Records, Cactus released predominantly reggae songs from artists such as Rupie Edwards, I-Roy, Pluto, John Holt and Judge Dread. The label had acquired the rights to music from Pyramid Records and had UK chart success with re-releases of Desmond Dekker's "Israelites" and with Dekker's, "Sing a Little Song".

== See also ==
- List of record labels
