= Sing a Little Song =

Single by Desmond Dekker
- B-side: "No Place Like Home"
- Released: 1975
- Genre: Reggae
- Length: 3:04
- Label: Cactus CT73
- Songwriter: D. Dacres
- Producer: Bruce Anthony

Desmond Dekker singles chronology
"Israelites - re-release" (1975)	"Sing a Little Song" (1975)	"Roots Rock" (1977)

"Sing a Little Song" is a song written and performed by Jamaican musician Desmond Dekker. It was released as a single in 1975.

It entered the UK Singles Chart in August that year, reaching number 16 and staying for seven weeks on the chart.

Following the death of Dekker's producer Leslie Kong in 1971, he found his music career floundering. In the mid-1970s, in an attempt at further success he combined with English production duo Tony Cousins and Bruce White, who went under the name Bruce Anthony. After two chart failures, the third single "Sing a Little Song" made the charts in 1975. As with some of Dekker's earlier releases such as "Problems", the B-side of his hit "It Mek", the song deals with life's hardships in a light-hearted manner.
