= Intensified =

Studio album by Desmond Dekker & the Aces
- Released: 1970
- Genre: Ska
- Label: Lagoon
- Producer: Leslie Kong

Desmond Dekker & the Aces chronology
This Is Desmond Dekkar (1969)	Intensified (1970)	You Can Get It If You Really Want (1970)

Professional ratings
Review scores
Source	Rating
Allmusic	4.5/5 stars

Intensified is an album by Desmond Dekker & the Aces released in 1970.

== Track listing ==
All tracks composed by Desmond Dekker; except where indicated

1. "It Mek" (Dekker, Leslie Kong) - 1:40
2. "Too Much Too Soon" (Dekker, Leslie Kong) - 2:38
3. "Coconut Water" - 3:27
4. "Sweet Music" - 2:29
5. "My Lonely World" - 3:16
6. "Rude Boy Train" (Dekker, Leslie Kong) - 2:16
7. "Poor Me Israelites" - 2:47
8. "It Is Not Easy" (Dekker, Leslie Kong) - 2:13
9. "Intensified" (Dekker, Leslie Kong) - 2:43
10. "Nincompoop" - 2:11
11. "Tips of My Fingers" (Bill Anderson) - 3:27
12. "Wise Man" - 2:15
