= The Isle of Man (song) =

"The Isle of Man" is a song written by George Formby, Harry Gifford and Frederick E. Cliffe. It was recorded by Formby on 28 November 1935 for Regal Zonophone Records. It was released with “Riding in the TT Races", both of them songs from the Isle of Man-set Ealing Studios comedy film No Limit which had been Formby's breakthrough screen role.

The song is typical of Formby's innuendo-laden style, telling a tale of women holidaying on the Isle of Man seeking romance only to find that, to their disappointment, their appears to be an absence of available men – in spite of the name of the island.

== Bibliography ==
- St. Pierre, Paul Matthew. Music Hall Mimesis in British Film, 1895-1960: On the Halls on the Screen. Associated University Presse, 2009.
- Bret, David. George Formby An Intimate Biography Of The Troubled Genius. 2014.
