= Machines Against the Rage =

Live album by TISM
- Released: December 1996
- Recorded: 21 October 1995
- Venue: Collingwood Town Hall
- Genre: Alternative rock
- Length: 49:39; 69:22 (2022 LP)
- Label: genre b.goode / Shock Records
- Producer: TISM

TISM chronology
Machiavelli and the Four Seasons (1995)	Machines Against the Rage (1996)	www.tism.wanker.com (1998)

Machines Against the Rage is a live album released by Australian alternative rock band TISM. The album was initially released as a bonus CD with limited edition re-issues of Machiavelli and the Four Seasons, and was also released as a promotional CD with a bonus copy of the "All Homeboys are Dickheads" single. The album peaked at number 87 on the ARIA Charts in February 1997.

The title is a re-wording of the name of the protest rock group Rage Against the Machine, who were nearing the height of their popularity at the time of this release.

On 25 November 2022, a double-vinyl reissue was released, featuring 4 songs and a spoken-word poem from the original concerts that were excised from the original CD release.

== Track listing ==
Original 1996 release
No.	Title	Length
1.	"All Homeboys Are Dickheads"	3:31
2.	"Death Death Death"	3:16
3.	"I'm Interested in Apathy"	3:01
4.	"Get Thee to a Nunnery"	2:43
5.	"Lilee Caught Dilley Bowled Milli Vanilli"	2:56
6.	"Martin Scorsese Is Really Quite a Jovial Fellow"	3:03
7.	"The History of Western Civilisation"	3:00
8.	"Saturday Night Palsy"	3:20
9.	"Aussiemandias"	4:27
10.	"Root"	2:43
11.	"I'll 'Ave Ya"	2:19
12.	"Defecate on My Face"	4:52
13.	"Give Up for Australia"	2:35
14.	"I Drive a Truck"	2:16
15.	"Mistah Eliot - He Wanker"	5:37

2022 expanded LP reissue
No.	Title	Length
1.	"All Homeboys Are Dickheads"	5:13
2.	"Death Death Death"	3:16
3.	"I'm Interested in Apathy"	3:08
4.	"What Nationality is Les Murray?"	4:21
5.	"Get Thee to a Nunnery"	2:45
6.	"Garbage"	3:28
7.	"Lilee Caught Dilley Bowled Milli Vanilli"	2:56
8.	"Martin Scorsese Is Really Quite a Jovial Fellow"	3:02
9.	"The History of Western Civilisation"	3:00
10.	"Ate Breakfast Off a Hooker's Tits" (diatribe)	4:01
11.	"Greg! The Stop Sign!!"	3:25
12.	"Saturday Night Palsy"	3:22
13.	"Aussiemandias"	4:34
14.	"(He'll Never Be An) Ol' Man River"	2:30
15.	"Root"	2:44
16.	"I'll 'Ave Ya"	2:19
17.	"Defecate on My Face"	4:52
18.	"Give Up for Australia"	2:35
19.	"I Drive a Truck"	2:16
20.	"Mistah Eliot - He Wanker"	5:36

== Charts ==
Chart (2007)	Peak position
Australian Albums (ARIA)	87

== Release history ==
Release history and formats for Machines Against the Rage
Region	Date	Format(s)	Edition	Label	Catalogue
Australia	December 1996	2×CD	Standard	Genre B.Goode / Shock	GOO7B/GOO8B
Australia	October 2009	Re-issue	Digital download	Genre B.Goode	—
Australia	November 2022	Re-issue	2LP	Genre B.Goode	GBG0030
