= Je t'aime... moi non plus =

"Je t'aime… moi non plus"
- Fontana variant of original French release (the image was also used for some other continental European releases and some re-releases).

Single by Serge Gainsbourg and Jane Birkin

from the album Jane Birkin/Serge Gainsbourg
- B-side: "Jane B."; "69 Année Érotique" (Belgium only)
- Released: February 1969
- Recorded: 1968
- Genre: Chanson; psychedelic pop; baroque pop
- Length: 4:22
- Label: UK: Fontana, Major Minor, Antic; US: Fontana
- Songwriter: Serge Gainsbourg
- Producer: Jack Baverstock

"Je t'aime... moi non plus" (French for 'I love you... me neither') is a 1967 song written by Serge Gainsbourg for Brigitte Bardot. In 1969, Gainsbourg recorded the best-known version as a duet with British actress Jane Birkin. Although this version topped the charts in Birkin's native United Kingdom, the first foreign-language song to do so, and number two in Ireland, it was banned in several countries because of its overtly sexual content. In 1976 Gainsbourg directed Birkin in an erotic film of the same name.

== History ==
The song was written and recorded in late 1967 for Gainsbourg's then-girlfriend, Brigitte Bardot. After a disappointing date with Bardot, she called him the following day "and demanded as a penance" that he write, for her, "the most beautiful love song he could imagine"; that night, he wrote "Je t'aime" and "Bonnie and Clyde". They recorded an arrangement of "Je t'aime" by Michel Colombier at a Paris studio in a two-hour session in a small glass booth. The engineer William Flageollet said there was "heavy petting". However, news of the recording reached the press, and Bardot's husband, German businessman Gunter Sachs, angrily called for the single to be withdrawn. Bardot pleaded with Gainsbourg not to release it. He complied, but was not pleased: "The music is very pure. For the first time in my life, I write a love song and it's taken badly."

In 1968, Gainsbourg and the English actress Jane Birkin began a relationship on the set of the film Slogan. After the end of filming, he asked her to record "Je t'aime" with him. Birkin had heard the Bardot version and considered it "so hot". Birkin has stated that "I only sang it because I didn't want anybody else to sing it", jealous at the thought of Gainsbourg sharing intimacy in the recording studio with someone else. Gainsbourg asked her to sing an octave higher than Bardot, "so [she'd] sound like a little boy". This version was recorded in an arrangement by Arthur Greenslade in a studio at Marble Arch Records. Birkin said that she "got a bit carried away with the heavy breathing – so much so, in fact, that I was told to calm down, which meant that at one point I stopped breathing altogether. If you listen to the record now, you can still hear that little gap."

There was media speculation, as with the Bardot version, that the recording documented unsimulated sex, to which Gainsbourg told Birkin, "Thank goodness it wasn't, otherwise I hope it would have been a long-playing record." The recording featuring Birkin was released as a single in February 1969. The single, which Philips relegated to its subsidiary Fontana, had a plain cover, with the words "forbidden to those under 21" ("Interdit aux moins de 21 ans").

Gainsbourg also asked Marianne Faithfull to record the song with him; she later recalled, "Hah! He asked everybody". Others whom Gainsbourg approached included Valérie Lagrange and Mireille Darc. Bardot later regretted not releasing her version, and her friend Jean-Louis Remilleux persuaded her to contact Gainsbourg. They released it in 1986.

== Lyrics and music ==
The title was inspired by a Salvador Dalí comment: "Picasso is Spanish, me too. Picasso is a genius, me too. Picasso is a communist, me neither". Gainsbourg described "Je t'aime" as an "anti-fuck" song about the desperation and impossibility of physical love. The lyrics are written as a dialogue between two lovers during sex. Phrases include:

"Je vais et je viens, entre tes reins" ("I go and I come, between your loins")

"Tu es la vague, moi l'île nue" ("You are the wave, me the naked island")

"L'amour physique est sans issue" ("Physical love is hopeless" [Gainsbourg sings 'sensationnel' in another version])

The lyrics are sung, spoken and whispered over baroque pop-styled organ and guitar tracks in the key of C major, with a "languid, almost over-pretty, chocolate-box melody".

"Je t'aime, moi non plus" is translated as "I love you – me not anymore" in the Pet Shop Boys' version.

== Reception ==
The lyrical subtleties were lost on late-1960s Brits. What they heard was an expertly stroked organ, orgasmic groans and a soft-focus melody, the musical equivalent of a Vaseline-smeared Emmanuelle movie. It was confirmation that life across the Channel was one of unchecked lubriciousness, and Je t'aime became as essential a part of any successful seduction as a chilled bottle of Blue Nun.

— Sylvie Simmons, Serge Gainsbourg: A Fistful of Gitanes, 2001

Some deemed the song's eroticism offensive. The lyrics are commonly thought to refer to the taboo of sex without love, and were delivered in a breathy, suggestive style. The Observer's Monthly Music magazine later called "Je t'aime" "the pop equivalent of an Emmanuelle movie".

When the version with Bardot was recorded, the French press reported that it was an "unedited recording" of physical intimacy ("audio vérité"). France Dimanche said the "groans, sighs, and Bardot's little cries of pleasure [give] the impression you're listening to two people making love". The first time Gainsbourg played the song in public was in a Paris restaurant immediately after he and Birkin recorded their version. Birkin said that "as it began to play all you could hear were the knives and forks being put down. 'I think we have a hit record', [Gainsbourg] said."

The sounds made by Birkin caused the song to be banned from radio in Spain, Sweden, Brazil, the United Kingdom, and Italy, banned from radio play before 11 pm in France, and not played by many radio stations in the United States. The song was officially denounced by the Vatican and its newspaper, L'Osservatore Romano; one report even claimed that the Vatican had excommunicated the record executive who released it in Italy. Birkin said that Gainsbourg had called the Pope "our greatest PR man". In Italy, the head of their record label was jailed for offending public morality.

Birkin said in 2004 that, "It wasn't a rude song at all. I don't know what all the fuss was about. The English just didn't understand it. I'm still not sure they know what it means." When Gainsbourg later went to Jamaica to record with Sly and Robbie, they initially did not get on well with Gainsbourg, but their mood changed immediately upon learning that "Je t'aime" was his work.

== Commercial success ==
The song was a commercial success throughout Europe, selling three million copies by October 1969. By 1986, it had sold four million copies. In the United Kingdom, it was released on the Fontana label, but, after reaching number two in September 1969, it was withdrawn from sale. Gainsbourg then arranged a deal with Major Minor Records, and on re-release in early October it reached number one, making it the first banned number one single in the UK and the first single in a foreign language to top the charts. It stayed on the UK chart for 31 weeks. In the United States, it peaked at number 58 on the Billboard Hot 100 chart. Mercury Records, the single's US distributor, faced criticism that the song was "obscene" and it received limited airplay, limiting US sales to around 150,000 copies.

The single was re-released in the UK in late 1974 on the Atlantic Records subsidiary Antic Records, peaking at No. 31 and charting for nine weeks. By August 1969, the single had sold 300,000 copies in Italy, while in France in 1969 alone sold 400,000 copies. In UK sales were over 250,000. By 1996, it had sold 6 million copies worldwide.

Chart (1969)	Peak position
Australia (Kent Music Report)	91
Ö3 Austria Top 40	1
Belgium (Ultratop 50 Flanders)	2
Belgium (Ultratop 50 Wallonia)	2
Canada (RPM Top Singles)	34
France (SNEP)	3
German Musikmarkt/Media Control Charts	3
Netherlands (Single Top 100)	2
Irish Singles Chart	2
Italy (FIMI)	2
Japan (Oricon)	47
Mexico (Radio Mil)	5
Norwegian VG-lista Chart	1
Swiss Top 100 Singles Chart	1
UK Singles Chart	1
US Billboard Hot 100	58
US Cash Box Top 100	92

== Cover versions ==
The song has been frequently covered in the years since its release. In 1969, the Hollywood 101 Strings Orchestra released a 7-inch record single (on A/S Records label) with two versions: the A-side featured a fully instrumental recording while the B-side had sexually suggestive vocalizations done by Bebe Bardon. The first covers were instrumentals, "Love at first sight", after the original was banned; the first version by a British group named Sounds Nice (featuring Tim Mycroft on keyboard) became a top 20 hit. (The group's name "sounds nice" represents the two words Paul McCartney said when he heard this instrumental cover of the song.)

The first parody was written in 1970 by Gainsbourg himself and Marcel Mithois. Titled "Ça", it was recorded by Bourvil and Jacqueline Maillan, Bourvil's last release before his death. Other comedy versions were made by Frankie Howerd and June Whitfield, Judge Dread, and Gorden Kaye and Vicki Michelle, stars of the BBC TV comedy 'Allo 'Allo! in character.

"Je t'aime" has also been widely sampled, including on the 1994 single "A Fair Affair (Je T'Aime)" by Misty Oldland.

Zvonimir Levačić 'Ševa' and Ivica Lako 'Laky', members of the Croatian antitelevision late night talk show Nightmare Stage, performed a live version of the song as part of a spoof singing competition during the show's airing. This version was later named the weirdest cover of the song ever.

== Legacy ==
The song influenced the 1975 disco track "Love to Love You Baby" by singer Donna Summer and producer Giorgio Moroder. In a note to Neil Bogart, producer A. J. Cervantes (son of politician Alfonso J. Cervantes), who previously worked for Casablanca Records, suggested an idea of Donna Summer recording the song. Bogart initially rejected the idea.

Cervantes' record label Butterfly Records released the disco rendition as "Je t'aime" by an all-female disco group Saint Tropez in August 1977, the first disco rendition of the song, as part of the album of the same name, Je T'aime (1977). Prompted by the minor success of Saint Tropez, a year later in 1978, Casablanca Records released the Summer and Moroder duet rendition of "Je t'aime" in a 15-minute version for the film Thank God It's Friday. The Summer–Moroder rendition was produced by Moroder and Pete Bellotte.

A non-lyrical rendition of the song was played at the tail end of the 2024 Summer Paralympics opening ceremony.

== See also ==
- List of songs banned by the BBC
