= List of Dutch Top 40 number-one singles of 1969 =

These hits topped the Dutch Top 40 in 1969.

Issue Date	Song	Artist(s)	Reference
4 January	"Hair"	Zen	
11 January	"Hair"	Zen	
18 January	"Hair"	Zen	
25 January	"Ain't Got No, I Got Life"	Nina Simone	
1 February	"Ain't Got No, I Got Life"	Nina Simone	
8 February	"Ain't Got No, I Got Life"	Nina Simone	
15 February	"Ain't Got No, I Got Life"	Nina Simone	
22 February	"Ain't Got No, I Got Life"	Nina Simone	
1 March	"Atlantis"	Donovan	
8 March	"Atlantis"	Donovan	
15 March	"Atlantis"	Donovan	
22 March	"Why"	The Cats	
29 March	"Why"	The Cats	
5 April	"Why"	The Cats	
12 April	"Why"	The Cats	
19 April	"Why"	The Cats	
26 April	"Goodbye"	Mary Hopkin	
3 May	"Goodbye"	Mary Hopkin	
10 May	"Get Back"	The Beatles	
17 May	"Get Back"	The Beatles	
24 May	"Israelites"	Desmond Dekker & the Aces	
31 May	"Israelites"	Desmond Dekker & the Aces	
7 June	"Oh Happy Day"	The Edwin Hawkins Singers	
14 June	"Oh Happy Day"	The Edwin Hawkins Singers	
21 June	"The Ballad of John and Yoko"	The Beatles	
28 June	"The Ballad of John and Yoko"	The Beatles	
5 July	"The Ballad of John and Yoko"	The Beatles	
12 July	"The Ballad of John and Yoko"	The Beatles	
19 July	"I Want to Live"	Aphrodite's Child	
26 July	"Give Peace a Chance"	Plastic Ono Band	
2 August	"Give Peace a Chance"	Plastic Ono Band	
9 August	"Saved by the Bell"	Robin Gibb	
16 August	"In the Year 2525 (Exordium and Terminus)"	Zager and Evans	
23 August	"In the Year 2525 (Exordium and Terminus)"	Zager and Evans	
30 August	"In the Year 2525 (Exordium and Terminus)"	Zager and Evans	
6 September	"In the Year 2525 (Exordium and Terminus)"	Zager and Evans	
13 September	"Don't Forget to Remember"	Bee Gees	
20 September	"Don't Forget to Remember"	Bee Gees	
27 September	"Bloody Mary"	Tom & Dick	
4 October	"Bloody Mary"	Tom & Dick	
11 October	"Bloody Mary"	Tom & Dick	
18 October	"My Special Prayer"	Percy Sledge	
25 October	"My Special Prayer"	Percy Sledge	
1 November	"My Special Prayer"	Percy Sledge	
8 November	"My Special Prayer"	Percy Sledge	
15 November	"My Special Prayer"	Percy Sledge	
22 November	"Oh Well (Part 1)"	Fleetwood Mac	
29 November	"Oh Well (Part 1)"	Fleetwood Mac	
6 December	"Oh Well (Part 1)"	Fleetwood Mac	
13 December	"Oh Well (Part 1)"	Fleetwood Mac	
20 December	"Marian"	The Cats	
27 December	"Marian"	The Cats	

== See also ==
- 1969 in music
