= Imagine Me in the Maginot Line =

1939 song

Song by George Formby
- Recorded: 17 December 1939
- Genre: Comic song
- Label: Regal Zonophone Records
- Songwriters: Harry Gifford; Fred E. Cliffe

"Imagine Me in the Maginot Line" (sometimes "Imagine Me on the Maginot Line") is a 1939 comedy song written by Harry Gifford and Fred E. Cliffe for the comedian George Formby. Formby recorded it on 17 December for Regal Zonophone Records. The title refers to the Maginot Line, a large defensive fortification in northern France, constructed to withstand assault from Nazi Germany. Formby voices a member of the British Expeditionary Force stationed to defend France during the Second World War.

The song was a hit, and Formby performed it when entertaining British troops. Popular during the Phoney War of 1939 to 1940, the song rapidly dated when the Germans attacked and successfully conquered France, with the remains of the BEF being evacuated from Dunkirk.
