= List of number-one hits of 1969 (Germany) =

This is a list of the German Media Control Top100 Singles Chart number-ones of 1969.

Issue date	Song	Artist
4 January	"Heidschi Bumbeidschi"	Heintje
11 January	"Heidschi Bumbeidschi"	Heintje
18 January	"Eloise"	Barry Ryan
25 January	"Eloise"	Barry Ryan
1 February	"Eloise"	Barry Ryan
8 February	"Eloise"	Barry Ryan
15 February	"Eloise"	Barry Ryan
22 February	"Eloise"	Barry Ryan
1 March	"Ob-La-Di, Ob-La-Da"	The Beatles
8 March	"Ob-La-Di, Ob-La-Da"	The Beatles
15 March	"Ob-La-Di, Ob-La-Da"	The Beatles
22 March	"Ob-La-Di, Ob-La-Da"	The Beatles
29 March	"Atlantis"	Donovan
5 April	"Atlantis"	Donovan
12 April	"Liebesleid"	Peter Alexander
19 April	"Liebesleid"	Peter Alexander
26 April	"Liebesleid"	Peter Alexander
3 May	"Crimson and Clover"	Tommy James and The Shondells
10 May	"Ich sing' ein Lied für dich"	Heintje
17 May	"Ich sing' ein Lied für dich"	Heintje
24 May	"Get Back"	The Beatles with Billy Preston
31 May	"Get Back"	The Beatles with Billy Preston
7 June	"Das Mädchen Carina"	Roy Black
14 June	"Das Mädchen Carina"	Roy Black
21 June	"Das Mädchen Carina"	Roy Black
28 June	"Israelites"	Desmond Dekker
5 July	"Israelites"	Desmond Dekker
12 July	"The Ballad of John and Yoko"	The Beatles
19 July	"The Ballad of John and Yoko"	The Beatles
26 July	"The Ballad of John and Yoko"	The Beatles
2 August	"Oh Happy Day"	Edwin Hawkins Singers
9 August	"Oh Happy Day"	Edwin Hawkins Singers
16 August	"Oh Happy Day"	Edwin Hawkins Singers
23 August	"Oh Happy Day"	Edwin Hawkins Singers
30 August	"In the Ghetto"	Elvis Presley
6 September	"In the Ghetto"	Elvis Presley
13 September	"In the Year 2525"	Zager & Evans
20 September	"In the Year 2525"	Zager & Evans
27 September	"In the Year 2525"	Zager & Evans
4 October	"In the Year 2525"	Zager & Evans
11 October	"In the Year 2525"	Zager & Evans
18 October	"In the Year 2525"	Zager & Evans
25 October	"Geh nicht vorbei"	Christian Anders
1 November	"Sugar, Sugar"	The Archies
8 November	"Sugar, Sugar"	The Archies
15 November	"Sugar, Sugar"	The Archies
22 November	"Sugar, Sugar"	The Archies
29 November	"Sugar, Sugar"	The Archies
6 December	"Come Together" / "Something"	The Beatles
13 December	"Come Together" / "Something"	The Beatles
20 December	"Sugar, Sugar"	The Archies
27 December	"Sugar, Sugar"	The Archies

== See also ==
- List of number-one hits (Germany)
