= Winker =

Winker may refer to:

- Blinders, also known as blinkers or winkers, a piece of horse tack that restrict the horse's vision
- Jesse Winker, an American baseball outfielder currently playing for the New York Mets
- Winker Watson, a fictional character who has his own comic strip in the UK comic The Dandy

== See also ==
- Wink (disambiguation)
- "The Winker's Song (Misprint)", song by Ivor Biggun and the Red Nosed Burglars (aka Doc Cox)
