= Action! (Desmond Dekker album) =

Studio album by Desmond Dekker & the Aces
- Released: 1968
- Recorded: 1967–68
- Genre: Ska
- Length: 41:01
- Label: Lagoon
- Producer: Leslie Kong

Desmond Dekker & the Aces chronology
Action! (1968)	This Is Desmond Dekkar (1969)

Professional ratings
Review scores
Source	Rating
Allmusic	4.5/5 stars

Action! is an album by Jamaican rocksteady and ska group Desmond Dekker & the Aces that they released in 1968. Singer-songwriter Desmond Dekker composed all of the tracks, which includes the song "007 (Shanty Town)".

== Track listing ==
All songs written by Desmond Dekker.

1. "Mother Pepper" – 2:21
2. "Don't Blame Me" – 2:24
3. "You've Got Your Troubles" – 3:13
4. "Personal Possession" – 2:55
5. "Unity" – 2:21
6. "007 (Shanty Town)" – 2:38
7. "It Pays" – 3:00
8. "Young Generation" – 2:08
9. "Mother Long Tongue" – 2:09
10. "Sabotage" – 2:44
11. "Mother's Young Girl" – 2:56
12. "Keep a Cool Head" – 2:01

== See also ==
- 1968 in music
