= This Is Desmond Dekkar =

Compilation album by Desmond Dekker
- Released: 1969
- Genre: Ska
- Label: Trojan
- Producer: Leslie Kong

Desmond Dekker chronology
| Action! (1968) | This Is Desmond Dekkar (1969) | Intensified (1970) |

Professional ratings
Review scores
| Source | Rating |
|---|---|
| Allmusic | 4.5/5 stars |

This Is Desmond Dekkar is an album by Desmond Dekker released in 1969. For unknown reasons Dekker is credited as "Dekkar" on the album's cover.

== Track listing ==
All songs written by Desmond Dekker.

1. "007 (Shanty Town)"
2. "Sabotage"
3. "Shing a Ling"
4. "Hey Grandma"
5. "Beautiful and Dangerous"
6. "Wise Man"
7. "Music Like Dirt"
8. "Rudy Got Soul"
9. "Unity"
10. "Mother Pepper"
11. "It Pays"
12. "Mother's Young Girl"

== Influence ==
A copy of the album can be seen on the wall of the 'shop' on the sleeve of The Style Council's 1985 single 'Come to Milton Keynes'.
