= A Fair Affair (Je T'Aime) =

Single by Misty Oldland

from the album Supernatural
- B-side: "Caroline"
- Released: 1994
- Genre: Pop-rap; soul; soft rock
- Length: 4:00
- Label: Columbia
- Songwriters: Misty Oldland; Serge Gainsbourg
- Producers: Fred Ala; Ivor Guest

Misty Oldland singles chronology
"Got Me a Feeling" (1993)	"A Fair Affair (Je T'Aime)" (1994)	"I Wrote You a Song" (1994)

Music video
- "A Fair Affair (Je T'Aime)" on YouTube

"A Fair Affair (Je T'Aime)" is a song by British–Swiss singer-songwriter Misty Oldland, released in 1994 by Columbia Records as the second single from the singer's debut album, Supernatural (1994). The song was co-produced by Oldland with Fred Ala and Ivor Guest. It is her most successful release and was a European hit, peaking at number five in Iceland and number ten in the Netherlands, while in France, it was a top-20 hit with a total of 29 weeks inside the French SNEP Top 50 singles chart. In the UK, it reached number 49 on the UK Singles Chart while it was a more successful club hit. The song samples the French song "Je t'aime... moi non plus" by Serge Gainsbourg. The music video for "A Fair Affair" was directed by British director Jake Nava, featuring Oldland in suit, performing with a group of women, also in suits, while they prance around in an urban city setting.

== Critical reception ==
In his review of the album, Tim de Lisle from The Independent wrote, "The tune draws on 'Dizzy' and 'Je t'aime', the words are like an unusually witty lecture and the whole thing is a beguiling pop-rap song." Upon the single release, Pan-European magazine Music & Media stated, "It takes a lot of guts to cover the horniest song in history but Misty has done it. A job only comparable to a striptease in public!" In a separate review, they stated that it "unclouded her talent as a performer." Ralph Tee from Music Week's RM Dance Update noted, "Fresh from her live showcase at Midem, Misty follows up her 'Got Me a Feeling' debut last year with another upmarket breezy soul tune."

Ian McCann from NME wrote, "Much of it (as the label admits) is borrowed from Serge Gainsbourg and Jane Birkin's 'Je t'aime', and the rest is like the opening of Erma Franklin's 'Piece of My Heart'. I can think of worse things to sound like, but this is just a shade too cutesy for comfort, despite the tune suddenly hitting a groove halfway through which imagines itself to be 'Let's Get It On'." Neil Spencer from The Observer felt Oldland's debut single "suggests she has found the slinky, club pop to fit her persona". Columnist James Hamilton from the Record Mirror Dance Update named it a "sultry sinuous tapping slow tugger" in his weekly dance column.

== Track listing ==
- 7" single, France (1994)

A: "A Fair Affair (Je T'aime)" — 4:00
B: "Caroline" (Live Acoustic Session) — 3:30

- 12", UK (1994)

A1: "A Fair Affair (Je T'aime)" (Misty's Magic Mix)
A2: "A Fair Affair (Je T'aime)" (Soulfish Mix)
B1: "A Fair Affair (Je T'aime)" (Misty's Biznizz Mix)
B2: "A Fair Affair (Je T'aime)" (4AM Chillum Mix)

- CD single, France (1994)
1. "A Fair Affair = Je T'aime" (7") — 4:00
2. "Caroline" (Live Acoustic Session) — 3:30
- CD single, Spain (1994)
1. "A Fair Affair (Je T'aime)" (7") — 4:00
2. "Caroline" (Live Acoustic Session) — 3:30
- CD single, Japan (1994)
1. "A Fair Affair (Je T'Aime)" (7") — 4:01
2. "Got Me a Feeling" (7") — 4:17
3. "Still My Heart" — 5:20
4. "Got Me a Feeling" (Hustlers Of Culture Remix) — 6:22
- CD maxi, UK & Europe (1994)
1. "A Fair Affair (Je T'aime)" (7") — 4:03
2. "A Fair Affair (Je T'aime)" (Misty's Magic Mix) — 4:49
3. "A Fair Affair (Je T'aime)" (Misty's Biznizz Mix) — 4:56
4. "Caroline" (Live Acoustic Session) — 3:30
- Cassette single, UK (1994)

A1. "A Fair Affair" (7")
A2. "Caroline" (Live Acoustic Session)
B1. "A Fair Affair" (7")
B2. "Caroline" (Live Acoustic Session)

== Charts ==
Chart (1994)	Peak position
Europe (European AC Radio)	16
Europe (European Dance Radio)	9
France (SNEP)	20
Iceland (Íslenski Listinn Topp 40)	5
Netherlands (Dutch Top 40 Tipparade)	10
Netherlands (Single Top 100)	41
Scotland (OCC)	45
UK Singles (OCC)	49
UK Dance (Music Week)	31
UK Club Chart (Music Week)	27
