= Don't Let's Be Beastly to the Germans =

1943 satirical song by Noël Coward

"Don't Let's Be Beastly To The Germans" is a satirical song composed by Noël Coward in 1943 during World War II. Although popular when performed live (British prime minister Winston Churchill demanded several encores when he first heard it) the humour did not translate well over the wireless and caused some fuss, leading the BBC to ban the song.

The refrain is:

Don't let's be beastly to the Germans
When our victory is ultimately won,
It was just those nasty Nazis who persuaded them to fight
And their Beethoven and Bach are really far worse than their bite
Let's be meek to them
And turn the other cheek to them
And try to bring out their latent sense of fun.
Let's give them full air parity
And treat the rats with charity,
But don't let's be beastly to the Hun.

== See also ==
- List of songs banned by the BBC
