= Clinton Ford (singer) =

English singer (1931–2009)

- Born: Ian George Stopford Harrison; 4 November 1931; Salford, Lancashire, England
- Died: 21 October 2009 (aged 77) Isle of Man
- Genres: Skiffle, trad jazz, country and western, traditional pop
- Occupation: Singer
- Instrument: Vocals
- Years active: Late 1950s–early 2000s
- Labels: Oriole; Piccadilly

Clinton Ford (born Ian George Stopford Harrison; 4 November 1931 – 21 October 2009) was an English popular singer of the 1950s and 1960s.

== Biography ==
He was born to George Henry Harrison and Annie Simpson who, in 1911, lived in Howard Street, off Eccles New Road in Salford, Lancashire.

Initially, he worked as a laboratory assistant, but in 1957 became a Butlins Redcoat in Pwllheli, and worked there for three summer seasons. During the winter season he sang with the Jazz Band called 'Merseysippi' at the Cavern Club in Liverpool, recording several songs with them, including "Get Out and Get Under".

He began his recording career as Clinton Ford with the Oriole record label, changing his name because his own did not fit some of his American songs. He performed skiffle in the Backwoods Skiffle Group and recorded some unsuccessful singles with the Hallelujah Skiffle Group. He appeared at the Royal Albert Hall, and with Ken Dodd on Dodd's television shows. Ford also appeared in Stars and Garters, The Billy Cotton Band Show, and The Good Old Days.

Ford had his first success with a cover of the Red Foley song "Old Shep", which appeared on the chart in 1959. Ford donated all his royalties from this recording to the Guide Dogs for the Blind. It was the only version of the song ever to chart in the UK. His next singles were "Too Many Beautiful Girls", followed by "Fanlight Fanny" which was his most successful single, reaching 22 in the UK Singles Chart in March 1962. His album Fanlight Fanny (1962) reached number 16 in the UK Albums Chart. He toured with Kenny Ball & His Jazzmen and played at the Cavern Club in Liverpool around the time that the Beatles were starting to become popular.

His career outlasted many of his contemporaries, with his singles appearing in the UK charts over a span of more than eight years. He was also in great demand on BBC Radio programmes, such as Saturday Club, where a live singer was required to sing standards and also covers of current hit songs.

After recording for Columbia Records, in 1966 Ford changed record label to Piccadilly Records. In 1967 "Run To The Door" again made the UK chart, and other singles including "Dandy" (popularized by Herman's Hermits) backed with another Formby number "Why Don't Women Like Me", and "This Song Is Just For You" were released. In 1968 Ford made the comic album Clinton The Clown with George Chisholm and the Inmates in a single all-night session. The album included "The Old Bazaar in Cairo", which Ford co-wrote with Ken Morris and Charlie Chester, and the suggestive "My Baby's Wild About My Old Trombone".

He set up a guest house with his wife on the Isle of Man, but continued to tour throughout the 1980s and 1990s. BBC Radio 2's veteran DJ, Brian Matthew, who was best man at Ford's wedding, revealed on his Sounds of the '60s show, on 10 March 2007, that Ford was living on the Isle of Man but was seriously ill, unable to work and bed-ridden.

Clinton Ford died on 21 October 2009. He was survived by his wife, Margaret (Maggie) née Worsfold, whom he married in 1962, and four children, Georgina, Susannah, Rebecca and Ian.

Ford's track "Dance With a Dolly (With a Hole in Her Stocking)" was chosen by the television producer Anne Wood as one of her Desert Island Discs in October 2011.

== Discography ==
=== Selected singles ===
Year	Single	Chart Positions	
Year	Single	UK	AU
1959	"Old Shep"	27	-
1961	"Too Many Beautiful Girls"	48	-
1962	"Fanlight Fanny"	22	-
1966	"Why Don't Women Like Me?"	-	29
1966	"Dandy"	54 (Note: Chart position is from the official UK "Breakers List".)	79
1967	"Run to the Door"	25	-
1968	"The Last One to Say Goodnight"	-	100

=== Albums ===
- Clinton Ford (1962) – UK No.16
- Listen With Us (1965 Columbia Records 33SX1689)
- Clinton The Clown (1968) with George Chisholm (Pye 182010)
- Songs For Children Aged One to a Hundred (1969) Marble Arch Records
