= Yob (slang) =

British slang for a loutish, uncultured person

Yob is slang in the United Kingdom for a loutish, uncultured person. In Australian slang, the word yobbo is more frequently used, with a similar although slightly less negative meaning.

== Etymology ==
The word itself is a product of back slang, a process whereby new words are created by spelling or pronouncing existing words backwards. The word yob is thus derived from the word boy. It only began to acquire a derogatory connotation in the 1930s.

== In popular culture ==
Australian alternative rock group TISM (This Is Serious Mum) released two singles for their fourth studio album, www.tism.wanker.com, which feature the term. The first single, "Yob", released in November 1997, details the "ingredients" which go into making up a yob. The second single, "Whatareya?", released in July 1998, makes fun of the difference between a yob and a wanker; both are the same, just merely separated by financial status.

The Yobs and The Yobbettes are a cartoon series written for Private Eye by Tony Husband from the 1980s to 2023.

UK band the Boys rearranged the "B" and the "Y" in their name and became the Yobs, releasing four singles and one album; 1980s Christmas Album. In this incarnation, the band members used the pseudonyms Noddy Oldfield, Ebenezer Polak, Kid Vicious and H. J. Bedwetter.

Popular Redlands, California landmark The Tartan created a drink called the Yob which is a Manhattan shot in a 40-US-fluid-ounce (1.18 L) King Cobra malt liquor served in a paper bag.

In Ghost in the Shell, ex-con junk dealer Kogie (a.k.a San Genfer) is referred to as a yobbo.

== See also ==
- Anti-social behaviour order
- Bogan
- Chav
- Feral (subculture)
- Hooliganism
- Lad culture
- Millwall brick
- Ned
- Pikey
- Tapori
- Yokel
