= Fanlight Fanny =

Single by Clinton Ford
- B-side: "Dreamy City Lullaby"
- Released: 1962
- Recorded: 1962
- Genre: Traditional pop
- Length: 2:49
- Label: Oriole Records - CB 1706
- Songwriters: George Formby, Harry Gifford and Fred E. Cliffe
- Producer: John Schroeder

Clinton Ford singles chronology
"Too Many Beautiful Girls" (1961)	"Fanlight Fanny" (1962)	"What More Can I Say" (1962)

"Fanlight Fanny" is a song written in 1935 by George Formby, Harry Gifford and Fred E. Cliffe, and recorded by Formby in May that year. Another notable version was released in 1962 by Clinton Ford.

== Song information ==
The original recording by George Formby was released on Decca Records (F5569) on 29 May 1935. The song also appeared in Formby's 1939 film Trouble Brewing, in which it bore an additional verse. It tells the tale of a tawdry, West End-based woman of a certain age, full with alcohol and shoplifted goods, trying to earn a living in a Soho night spot, where she is "Fanlight Fanny the frowsey night-club queen".

The version recorded by Clinton Ford in 1962 had accompaniment by the 'George Chisholm All Stars'. It also, with permission, had added new words written by Ford. "Fanlight Fanny" was Ford's third UK chart hit and his most successful single, reaching No. 22 in the UK Singles Chart in March 1962. It spent ten weeks in that chart. His album Clinton Ford, also known as Clinton Ford Sings Fanlight Fanny (1962), peaked at number 16 in the UK Albums Chart.

Ford later recorded the Wally Lindsay-penned "Fanlight Fanny’s Daughter" (1963), a track also released as a single, albeit with less success. In 1968, on Ford's album Clinton The Clown (re-released in 1970 on Marble Arch Records), the song's character reappeared as "Fan-Dance Fanny", a renaming and re-recording which had a small change in lyrical content. With the passage of six years, Fanny wore "dustbin lids on her chest" rather than her earlier "saucepan lids".

== Other uses ==
Formby's original version was used on the soundtrack to the 2008 horror film Chemical Wedding.
