= When I'm Cleaning Windows =

1936 comic song

Single by George Formby
- B-side: "Keep Your Seats Please"
- Released: November 1936
- Recorded: 27 September 1936
- Genre: Comedy
- Length: 2:56
- Label: Regal Zonophone
- Songwriters: George Formby; Harry Gifford; Fred E. Cliffe

George Formby singles chronology
| "Ring Your Little Bell" (1936) | "When I'm Cleaning Windows" (1936) | "Sitting on the Sands all Night" (1936) |

"When I'm Cleaning Windows" (also known as "The Window Cleaner") is a comedy song performed by English comic, actor and ukulele player George Formby. It first appeared in the 1936 film Keep Your Seats, Please. The song was credited as written by Formby, Harry Gifford and Fred E. Cliffe. Formby performed the song in A♭ in the film; for the single release, the key was changed to B♭.

Following the success of the song, he recorded another version of the song, entitled "The Window Cleaner (No. 2)". This song uses similar orchestration to the original version, and it is about further observations which were seen on a window cleaning round.

The song's lyrics were considered racy for the time, and it was consequently banned for radio play by the BBC. The corporation's director general John Reith stated that "if the public wants to listen to Formby singing his disgusting little ditty, they'll have to be content to hear it in the cinemas, not over the nation's airwaves"; Formby, and his wife and manager Beryl Ingham, were dismayed with the block on the song. In May 1941, Ingham informed the BBC that the song was a favourite of the royal family, particularly Queen Mary, while a statement by Formby pointed out that "I sang it before the King and Queen at the Royal Variety Performance". The BBC relented and started to broadcast the song.

The record's sales were so successful that Regal Zonophone awarded Formby the first silver disc for sales of over 100,000 copies.
