= Misty Oldland =

British-Swiss singer-songwriter (born 1966)

- Birth name: Michele Oldland
- Also known as: Misty Oldland
- Born: 5 February 1966 (age 59); London, England
- Genres: Soul
- Occupation(s): Singer-songwriter, record producer, author, artist
- Instrument(s): Vocals, piano, cello
- Website: https://www.ecodisco.com/

Misty Oldland (born Michéle Oldland) is a British singer-songwriter. Her songs include "A Fair Affair (Je T'Aime)" and "Got Me a Feeling", featuring soul singer Omar Lye-Fook.

Three of her singles charted on the UK Singles Chart while also scoring top 10 singles across Europe and Japan. Most notably in France, her album Supernatural topped the charts for six months and in Iceland it was also number one.

Oldland's songs have been covered by international artists Ophélie Winter (France), Kate Ceberano (Australia) and Bonnie Pink (Japan).

Oldland's other work includes presenting Soul of MTV and co-founding rare groove, soul and hip-hop club Slow Motion with video director and former partner Jake Nava. The latter was listed in the "Top 10 British Night Clubs" by The Sunday Times.

In 1998, Oldland went on a songwriting hiatus to "the Roots camp" in Philadelphia, including participating in their NYC open mic jams alongside influencing artists such as Common, De La Soul and Q-Tip. Whilst there, she was asked by Mushroom a.k.a. Andrew Vowles, formerly of Massive Attack to join a new supergroup he was putting together with house singer Robert Owens, producer Mike Timothy and gospel singer Saron Cherry.

In 2006, Oldland was named "A Woman of Achievement" by the Woman of the Year organisation for self-releasing her album Forest Soul. The record sampled the sounds of endangered animals and featured musical collaborations with co-producer Joe Dworniak and British artists Roachford, Cleveland Watkiss, Tunde Jegede, Faye Simpson, Nikki Brown, Glen Nightingale and HKB Finn.

Created to raise awareness for rainforest conservation, Forest Soul was the first carbon neutral CD sleeve to use vegetable ink, a waterless printing method as well as being packaged in the first 100% recycled LP sleeve. Oldland's single "Orange Fox" came in a 'sing-along' book for children with an animated video.

Oldland credits the record's success to Dame Anita Roddick and Gordon Roddick of The Body Shop Foundation, who mentored her in ethical business and invested in Forest Soul. Oldland contributed a chapter for Anita Roddick's book A Revolution in Kindness and is developing a multi-media conservationist series for children called The Golden Seed.

In between writing and composing, Oldland works behind the scenes to create campaigns with NGO's and environmental activists. She was part of the original think tank behind the creation of 38 Degrees and has collaborated with the Green Party, Greenpeace, Stop Ecocide, The Ecologist, Polly Higgins, Tamsin Omond, The Inga Foundation and Climate Rush.

Oldland's French Swiss ancestral heritage includes Italian, North African and Spanish. Her maternal grandparents belong to two entrepreneurial Swiss families: the Seiler hoteliers of Zermatt, founded by Alexander Seiler and the Bonvin wine growers of Sion.

== Discography ==
=== Albums ===
- 1994 – Supernatural – Columbia
- 1997 – Luminous – Epic/Sony
- 2006 – Forest Soul – Mistic Discs.

=== Singles ===
- 1993 – "Got Me a Feeling" – UK No. 59
- 1994 – "A Fair Affair (Je T'Aime)" – UK No. 49
- 1994 – "I Wrote You a Song" – UK No. 73
- 1994 – "Groove Eternity"
- 2003 – "Orange Fox"
