= Harry Gifford (songwriter) =

English songwriter (1877–1960)

- Born: Gifford Folkard; 1877; Dalston, London, England
- Died: 8 January 1960 (aged 82); Streatham, London
- Occupation: Songwriter
- Known for: Co-writing songs with Fred E. Cliffe for George Formby

Gifford Folkard (1877 – 8 January 1960), known professionally as Harry Gifford, was an English songwriter. He worked from the 1900s but is best known for his work in the 1930s co-writing songs with Fred E. Cliffe for entertainer George Formby.

== Early life and career ==
He was born and grew up in Dalston, London (not in Plymouth as sometimes claimed), and after working as a salesman became a writer of popular songs for music hall artistes. His early co-writes with other writers included "I Like Your Old French Bonnet" (with Tom Mellor and Alf J. Lawrance, 1906, performed by Harry Fay), "If I Hadn't Got a Girl Like You" (with Mellor and Lawrance, 1907, performed by Gordon Stretton), "She Sells Seashells" (with Terry Sullivan, 1908, performed by Wilkie Bard), "My Indiana Queen" and "She's Somebody's Sweet Heart" (both with Mellor, 1909, performed by Gordon Stretton), "There's a Brown Gal Way Down in Old Dahomey" (with Mellor, 1910, performed by Gordon Stretton), "It's Nice To Have A Friend" (with Mellor, 1913, performed by Florrie Forde), "Hey Ho! Can’t You Hear the Steamer?" (with Fred Godfrey, 1913, performed by Ella Retford), "When It's Apple Blossom Time in Normandy" (with Mellor and Huntley Trevor, 1913), "All the Boys in Khaki Get the Nice Girls" (with Mellor, 1915), and "Save Your Kisses Till The Boys Come Home" (with Godfrey and Mellor, 1915).

Gifford re-emerged in the 1930s as a songwriter for George Formby, working in particular with Fred E. Cliffe. Their most popular songs include "Fanlight Fanny" (1935), "With My Little Stick of Blackpool Rock" (1936), "When I'm Cleaning Windows" (1936), "It’s Turned Out Nice Again" (1939), "Mr. Wu’s a Window Cleaner Now" (1939), "Imagine Me in the Maginot Line" (1939) and "Bunty’s Such A Big Girl Now" (1943), some of which also included Formby's name as a co-writer. He contributed songs to many of Formby's films.

In 1960, aged 82, Gifford died at home in Streatham. He was unmarried and lived with his sister.
