= Doc Cox =

British singer

Robert "Doc" Cox (born 1 July 1946), also known as Ivor Biggun, is a British musician and former television journalist. He is known for his appearances on the BBC TV programme That's Life! from 1982 to 1992 and for four albums of humorous, smutty songs. Currently resident in Suffolk, he is active in several pub bands, including the Trembling Wheelbarrows.

== Education ==
Cox was educated at the King Edward VI Grammar School in Retford, Nottinghamshire.

== That's Life! ==
After some years as a teacher, Cox became a sound engineer with the BBC in 1969. Later he became a warm-up man for That's Life!; he recalled that one day "Someone didn't turn up for one of the auditions or something, and I was sort of pushed in". In October 2008, Cox was part of a That’s Life! reunion broadcast on BBC London 94.9. Cox said of the impending reunion: "It'll be lovely to chat to Esther again. Somebody once asked me who my greatest influences were, and I had to reply 'Buddy Holly, George Formby, my dad, Martin Luther King and Esther Rantzen'."

== Ivor Biggun ==
Under the Biggun name, Cox fronts a humorous band that is sometimes billed simply as "Ivor Biggun", or variously "Ivor Biggun and the Red-nosed Burglars" or "Ivor Biggun and the Left-handed Wankers", also "Ivor’s Jivers" (less rude), or Ivor Biggun's Vulgar Band. He specialises in double entendre-laden smutty songs. Ivor Biggun has released four albums of bawdy songs (and recorded with Judge Dread and David "Screaming Lord" Sutch), the most recent being 2005's Handling Swollen Goods.

Johnny Rotten selected "The Winker's Song (Misprint)" as his single of the week in 1978 when he was a guest reviewer for New Musical Express. The single sold well, reaching number 22 in the UK Singles Chart thanks to Rotten's support. However, it was banned by nearly all radio stations due to its explicit lyrics. The single "Bras on 45 (Family Version)", credited to "Ivor Biggun and the D Cups", reached number 50 in the UK Singles Chart in 1981 and remained in the charts for three weeks.

== Discography ==
- 1978 The Winker's Album (Misprint) BBL1CD
- 1979 "The Winker's Rock 'n' Roll" (Extended Play single "7 incher") BOP5
- 1981 More Filth! Dirt Cheap BBL3CD
- 1987 Partners in Grime BBL79CD
- 1999 The Fruity Bits of Ivor Biggun (Greatest hits)
- 2005 Handling Swollen Goods TOSSA2CD
- 2006 More Fruity Bits! The Rest of Ivor Biggun (Misprint) (Second greatest hits, double CD)
- 2021 The Compleat Works of Ivor Biggun TOSSA5CD (5-CD Set including The Winker's Album, Handling Swollen Goods, More Filth! Dirt Cheap!, Partners in Grime and a bonus disc of previously unreleased material dating up to the 2020s – Something Old, Something New, Something Borrowed, Mostly Blue)
