= Big Seven (song) =

Single by Judge Dread
- B-side: "Dread"
- Released: 1972
- Genre: Reggae
- Label: Big Shot Records
- Songwriter(s): Judge Dread, Bunny Lee, Ed Lemon

Judge Dread singles chronology
"Big Six" (1972)	"Big Seven" (1972)

"Big Seven" is a song and single written by Bunny Lee, Ed Lemon and Judge Dread performed by Dread and released in 1972.

"Big Seven" was Dread's second UK hit single and biggest hit. It made 8 on the UK Singles Charts in 1972 staying in the charts for 18 weeks.

== Origin ==
The basis for "Big Seven" was Slim Smith's "My Conversation", already familiar to audiences in Jamaica. As with his previous single, "Big Six", "Big Seven" is in the form of a reggae tune with Dread toasting crude and innuendo filled lyrics over the tune. As with "Big Six", this song was also banned by the BBC.
