= With My Little Stick of Blackpool Rock =

Single by George Formby
- A-side: "Oh, Dear Mother"
- Recorded: 24 January 1937
- Label: Regal Zonophone
- Songwriters: Harry Gifford, Fred E. Cliffe, George Formby

"With My Little Stick of Blackpool Rock" is a popular song by English entertainer George Formby, who recorded it in 1937. It was written by his regular songwriting team of Harry Gifford and Fred E. Cliffe, with input from Formby himself.

The song was recorded on 24 January 1937, for Regal Zonophone Records, and was released on a 78 rpm single as the B-side of his song "Oh, Dear Mother". It became one of Formby's signature songs. However, according to Simon Frith, the management of BBC Radio were concerned about broadcasting the song, because of its sexual innuendos, in lines such as: "With my little stick of Blackpool rock, along the promenade I stroll / It may be sticky but I never complain, it's nice to have a nibble at it now and again"; "In my pocket it got stuck I could tell / 'Cos when I pulled it out I pulled my shirt off as well"; and "In the ballroom I went dancing each night / No wonder every girl I danced with stuck to me tight." The producer of one of Formby's live television programmes received a letter from a BBC manager in 1946 that stated "We have no record that 'With My Little Stick of Blackpool Rock' is banned. We do however know, and so does Formby, that certain lines in the lyric must not be broadcast".

The song is included on many later compilations of Formby's recordings.
