= Big Six (song) =

Single by Judge Dread
- B-side: "One Armed Bandit"
- Released: 1972
- Genre: Reggae
- Label: Big Shot Records
- Songwriter(s): Judge Dread, Alvin Ranglin

Judge Dread singles chronology
"Big Six" (1972)	"Big Seven" (1972)

"Big Six" is a song and single written by Alvin Ranglin and Judge Dread performed by Dread and released in 1972.

"Big Six" was Dread's first UK hit single. It made 11 on the UK Singles Chart in 1972 staying there for 27 weeks. Costing only £6 to record and described as "lewd", the song received almost no radio airplay due to its risqué lyrics. The song consists of Dread's ribald lyrics over a nursery rhyme tune.

== Origin ==
When Prince Buster had a big underground hit in 1969 with "Big 5", singer Alexander Hughes capitalised on it with the recording of his own "Big Six", based on Verne & Son's "Little Boy Blue", which was picked up by Trojan boss Lee Gopthal, and released on Trojan's 'Big Shot' record label under the stage name Judge Dread, the name taken from another of Prince Buster's songs.

According to UK newspaper The Independent, this came about after he played the track to Trojan Records' production team in 1972: one of the team, Joe Sinclair, later recalled: "When Dread brought in his demo, we didn't exactly think it was a national hit but we reckoned we could pick up something around the region of 70,000 sales with the help of a change of title. You see, the Judge called it 'Little Boy Blue', whereas I thought 'Big Six' would create interest by making the association with Prince Buster's 'Big Five' more obvious. It sold 300,000 copies in the UK and in 1973, it made No 1 in Africa."

As a reggae song, it was also popular in Jamaica, so much so that Dread visited the country to perform in Kingston to a surprised audience who, until he appeared on stage, had never considered that he might be white.
