= I'm Interested in Apathy =

Single by TISM

from the album Great Truckin' Songs of the Renaissance
- B-side: Gas! Gas! – An Ecstasy of Fumbling; The Judeo-Christian Ethic
- Released: September 1988
- Recorded: May 1987–March 1988
- Studio: Platinum Studios
- Genre: Alternative rock
- Length: 2:55
- Label: Elvis Records
- Songwriter(s): TISM

TISM singles chronology
"The Ballad of John Bonham's Coke Roadie" (1988)	"I'm Interested in Apathy" (1988)	"Saturday Night Palsy" (1989)

"I'm Interested in Apathy" is a single by Australian alternative rock band, TISM, released in September 1988 as the third single from their debut album, Great Truckin' Songs of the Renaissance. The title is an oxymoron as apathy is literally a "lack of interest". A 12" version, with a bonus track, was issued in December 1988.

At the ARIA Music Awards of 1989, the song won Best Independent Release.

== Lyrics ==
"I'm Interested in Apathy" details the life of a man who has many ideas which range from either life saving, supernatural, answers to conspiracy theories or simply absurd abilities; however, none of these things faze him, nor does he act upon them, because his main focus is apathy. His interest in apathy even prevents him from properly finishing the song, which ends with "Well, here we are at the last verse / I've lost interest."

Among the things the main claims to know or be able to do are: drilling for oil in the Bass Strait, being able to prove Einstein's theory wrong, predicting mankind's fate and knowing what really happened in regards to Marilyn Monroe's death.

== Track listing ==
7" single (MUS SP 2002)

- Side A - "I'm Interested in Apathy" - 2:53
- Side B - "Gas! Gas! – An Ecstasy of Fumbling" - 2:51
1. "The Judeo-Christian Ethic" (Only on 12")

12" single (MUS 12" 2002)

- Side A - "I'm Interested in Apathy" - 2:53
- Side B1 - "Gas! Gas! – An Ecstasy of Fumbling" - 2:51
- Side B2 - "The Judeo-Christian Ethic" - 1:37
