= Www.tism.wanker.com =

1998 studio album by TISM

www.tism.wanker.com
- One of the 7 different covers, depicting band member Eugene de la Hot-Croix Bun

Studio album by TISM
- Released: 2 June 1998
- Recorded: May 1997 – January 1998
- Studios: Kiss Studios, Seed Studios, Sing Sing, Rev. Ian Paisley Park Studios
- Genre: Alternative rock
- Length: 45:40 (original album); 57:06 (1998 bonus disc); 78:28 (2022 reissue)
- Label: genre b.goode / Shock Records
- Producer: TISM

TISM chronology
Machines Against the Rage (1996)	www.tism.wanker.com (1998)	De RigueurMortis (2001)

Singles from www.tism.wanker.com
- 1. "Yob" Released: November 1997; 2. "I Might Be a Cunt, but I'm Not a Fucking Cunt" Released: April 1998; 3. "Whatareya?" Released: July 1998; 4. "Thunderbirds Are Coming Out" Released: October 1998

www.tism.wanker.com is the fourth studio album by Australian alternative rock group TISM (This Is Serious Mum), released in June 1998. The album peaked at number 26 on the ARIA charts.

At the ARIA Music Awards of 1998, the album was nominated for the ARIA Award for Best Independent Release.

The title references an internet URL which, at the time of release, was a subdomain (of wanker.com) provided by a friendly person overseas who had registered wanker.com, as TISM were not able to obtain their preferred domain, wanker.com.au, due to Australian domain regulations. However, the web hosting fees were not paid; subsequently, it was taken down by the hosting ISP several months after launch and has not been available since.

Early editions of the CD featured a CD-ROM component. The program asks the user whether they want to continue—repeatedly. Eventually, it responds, "OK then. Downloading virus." No virus is actually downloaded.

In October 2009, the album was released to iTunes for digital download, with nine bonus tracks from the band's 1996 gospel demo session No Penis, No God as bonus tracks. On 16 April 2024, No Penis, No God was released on limited-edition bootleg-style LP, with five unreleased bonus tracks from the sessions.

On 12 October 2022, the album was announced for a November reissue on CD and blue vinyl, with the CD containing five of the six actual songs from the original 1998 bonus CD, Att: Shock Records Faulty Pressing Do Not Manufacture (the rest of the tracks were poems and recordings of the band talking amongst each other), plus "Drop the 'Tude", a B-side to the "I Might Be a Cunt, but I'm Not a Fucking Cunt" single.

In May 2023, the band released a seven-disc box set called the Wanker Box, celebrating the album's 25th anniversary. This features the original 12-track album, the six bonus songs included on the 2022 CD reissue, plus 12 songs from the rare Att: Shock Records Faulty Pressing Do Not Manufacture compilation (originally included as a bonus disc with the 1998 CD release), mixes and B-sides and more than a dozen previously unreleased tracks. The riff to "Choose Lose", one of the unreleased tracks from the boxset, would later be used for the band's 2024 single "Death to Art", while the lyrics were later rewritten and used as the basis for the unreleased song "Sickie", which was only performed live in 1998 and 1999.

== Singles ==
"Yob" was released in November 1997 as the album's lead single. This song details the "ingredients" which go into making up a "yobbo".

"I Might Be a Cunt, but I'm Not a Fucking Cunt" was released in April 1998 as the album's second single. The song peaked at number 90 on the ARIA charts. The song and its accompanying music video of a couple having sex were banned by the SBS, ABC's rage, and Triple J due to their content; however, it was played quite frequently by Melbourne independent broadcaster 3RRR on the Breakfasters show. Bruce Ruxton, the head of the Victorian Branch of the Australian RSL, wrote a letter of complaint to Shock Records asking for TISM to be fired from the label, and describing the song as "dropping [Australia's standards] through the floor into the proverbial sewer". Ron Hitler-Barassi of TISM responded to criticism in an interview, saying, "I actually like the song, the thing that disappoints me about some of the reaction to the song is people's reaction was confined to 'oh how naughty, oh those naughty boys TISM have said a naughty word, fuck, and another naughty word, cunt, and oh that's so naughty' and I must admit, I was sort of, and I shouldn't have, I was disappointed with that reaction ... We were attempting to use the common dialect of people in the street, to sum up a term, have a good pisstake. It's more than just naughtiness. That's very profound isn't it?"

In 2015, when asked if the choice to release "I Might Be a Cunt, but I'm Not a Fucking Cunt" as a follow up single after commercial success, was meant as a mocking message to the music industry. Humphrey B. Flaubert stated that it was instead hubris, as they had believed that their radio play at the time would allow them to get away with anything, but instead the band never truly recovered.

"Whatareya?" was released in July 1998 as the album's third single. The song peaked at number 66 on the ARIA charts.

"Thunderbirds Are Coming Out" was released in October 1998 as the fourth and final single from the album.

== Reception ==
Professional ratings
Review scores
Source	Rating
AllMusic	2.5/5 stars
Beat	7/10

Jonathan Lewis from AllMusic said, "www.tism.wanker.com was a misbegotten attempt to recreate the success of its predecessor, but it fails on most counts. Machiavelli was a funny album: tasteless, yet tongue-in-cheek enough to charm listeners. www.tism.wanker.com, however, was simply offensive. The humour was forced, the lyrics less clever than on previous outings, and the music was becoming stale." Lewis said "Highlights were few and far between, although 'Thunderbirds Are Coming Out' was a standout." In July 1998 issue of Beat Magazine, Bronius Zumerius in is 7/10 review of the album, said the dance element explored in their previous album Machiavelli and the Four Seasons continues as the band "grasp at current dance trends with some precision", along with the social commentary of tracks like "Whatareya?", "Denial Works for Me" and "(There's Gonna Be) Sex Tonite", mingling with the tongue in cheek tracks like "Been Caught Wankin'", "Yob'" and "I Might Be A Cunt, But I'm Not A Fucking Cunt", "with fist in the air, lunatic dancing, screaming, lung bursting effect." He concludes the review of the album saying it's "not their most exemplary material, but enough chortles are to be had to validate its existence."

== Track listings ==
www.tism.wanker.com
No.	Title	Length
1.	"(There's Gonna Be) Sex Tonite"	3:38
2.	"Whatareya?"	3:34
3.	"Dumb 'n' Base"	4:52
4.	"Thunderbirds Are Coming Out"	3:25
5.	"Been Caught Wankin'"	4:06
6.	"Denial Works For Me"	5:01
7.	"The Parable of Glenn McGrath's Haircut"	4:13
8.	"I Might Be a Cunt, but I'm Not a Fucking Cunt" (censored on back cover)	2:47
9.	"Yob"	3:21
10.	"Great Expectorations"	3:27
11.	"A Hard-Earned Thirst Needs a Big Cold Beer, but I Drink to Get Pissed"	3:29
12.	"The Men's Room"	3:47

2022 CD reissue bonus tracks
No.	Title	Length
13.	"Describe the Worst Headjob I've Ever Had? Fantastic!"	6:57
14.	"The Last Australian Guitar Hero"	6:53
15.	"Drop the 'Tude"	4:20
16.	"The Apology of the Thai Drug Runner"	5:22
17.	"Opposite Day"	5:06
18.	"Ya Gotta Love That"	4:05

iTunes re-release bonus tracks – Att: Shock Records
No.	Title	Length
13.	"Describe the Worst Headjob I've Ever Had? Fantastic!"	8:45
14.	"The Last Australian Guitar Hero"	6:53
15.	"Kate – Fischer of Men"	2:11
16.	"My Brilliant Huntington's Chorea"	3:35
17.	"The Apology of the Thai Drug Runner"	5:42
18.	"Julius Seizure (Act III Scene ii Verses 73-118)"	4:49
19.	"Neighbours – Everybody Loves Good Neighbours"	5:16
20.	"Opposite Day"	5:25
21.	"Rebel Without a Paunch"	3:13
22.	"I'd Be Happier If I Was More Depressed"	3:46
23.	"Professor Derrida Deconstructs"	3:21
24.	"Ya Gotta Love That"	4:04

digital re-release bonus tracks – No Penis, No God (2009)
No.	Title	Length
25.	"Ain't No Christian, But I Believe in Jesus"	2:20
26.	"I Lost My Man to the Lord"	2:13
27.	"Then the Answer Came"	1:37
28.	"Jesus Doesn't Believe in Jesus Anymore"	3:00
29.	"He Ain't Stopped Livin', He's Only Dead"	2:50
30.	"When Jesus Comes"	1:53
31.	"Club Heaven"	3:32
32.	"I Never Got the Message"	3:29
33.	"It Don't Matter What You Say"	4:39

=== Att: Shock Records Faulty Pressing Do Not Manufacture ===
Initial pressings of the album were shipped with a bonus disc. The CD in question looks like a blank CDR, with texta writing that reads "Att: SHOCK RECORDS FAULTY PRESSING DO NOT MANUFACTURE"; thinking it was serious, some retail chains actually returned boxes of the "fake" CDs unopened. In reality, it featured six outtakes from the wanker.com sessions and several poems, bookended by low-quality audio recordings of Hitler-Barassi and Flaubert discussing various topics whilst watching a pornographic film.

The "conversation" tracks have never been given an official title. For the iTunes re-release, these tracks were appended to the start/end of the titled tracks. The titles were available on TISM's website at the time.

"The Last Australian Guitar Hero", "Kate - Fischer of Men" and "I'd Be Happier if I Wasn't More Depressed" were released as B-sides to singles.

On 29 April 2023, the conversation tracks were released for free on the group's Bandcamp page.

No.	Title	Length
1.	"Conversation About Porn" (Unlisted)	0:52
2.	"Describe the Worst Headjob You've Ever Had? – Fantastic!"	6:49
3.	"Conversation About This Kid" (Unlisted)	1:03
4.	"The Last Australian Guitar Hero"	6:27
5.	"Conversation About Springvale" (Unlisted)	0:25
6.	"Kate, Fischer of Men"	2:11
7.	"My Brilliant Huntington's Chorea"	2:38
8.	"Conversation About Private Schools" (Unlisted)	0:56
9.	"Apology of the Thai Drug Runner"	5:21
10.	"Conversation About Reviews" (Unlisted)	0:21
11.	"Julius Seizure (Act III, Scene II, verse 73-118)"	4:49
12.	"Neighbours – Everybody Loves Good Neighbours"	4:55
13.	"Conversation About Robin Trower" (Unlisted)	0:21
14.	"Opposite Day"	5:05
15.	"Conversation About Super" (Unlisted)	0:19
16.	"Rebel Without a Paunch"	2:26
17.	"Conversation About Bad Music" (Unlisted)	0:47
18.	"I'd Be Happier If I Was More Depressed"	3:25
19.	"Conversation About Cross-Fades" (Unlisted)	0:20
20.	"Professor Derrida Deconstructs"	3:21
21.	"Ya Gotta Love That"	4:04
Total length:		56:55

== Charts ==
Chart (1998)	Peak position
Australian Albums (ARIA)	26

== Release history ==
Release history for www.tism.wanker.com
Region	Date	Format(s)	Edition	Label	Catalogue
Australia	June 1998	CD+CD-ROM	Standard	genre b.goode	GOO12
Australia	2001	CD+CD-ROM	Re-issue	Genre B.Goode, Festival Mushroom	TISM001
Australia	October 2009	Digital download	Re-issue	Genre B.Goode	—N/a
Australia	May 2023	4×CD	Re-issue		—N/a
