= Whatareya? =

Single by TISM

from the album www.tism.wanker.com
- B-side: Untz... Untz.... Untz...; I’d Be Happier If I Was More Depressed
- Released: 6 July 1998
- Recorded: May–November 1997
- Studio: Paisley Park
- Genre: Dance-pop, alternative rock
- Length: 3:34
- Label: Shock/genre b.goode
- Songwriter(s): TISM
- Producer(s): Laurence Maddy, Magoo, TISM

TISM singles chronology
"'I Might Be A Cunt, But I'm Not A Fucking Cunt'" (1998)	"Whatareya?" (1998)	"'Thunderbirds Are Coming Out'" (1998)

"Whatareya?" is a song by Australian alternative rock band, TISM, released in July 1998 as the third single from their fourth studio album www.tism.wanker.com. "Whatareya?" peaked at number 66 on the ARIA Charts.

== Reception ==
Junkee said, "No song that starts with the words, 'I'm a wanker' repeated ad nauseum [sic] deserves to be this good. But that’s the thing about TISM — they’re masters of turning shit into diamonds, and vice versa, grubbying up the established norms of Australian rock and pop and making jokes about James Hird seem like Shakespearean wordplay."

== Video ==
The video was directed by Craig Melville and follows a scene very reminiscent of an early morning aerobics television show, Aerobics Oz Style in which TISM are in the class. After a very short time the members of TISM are depicted as being quite fatigued with the exercise routine and take a rest – some members bring in a couch to sit on and a television to watch, meanwhile another member brings an esky of beer and a football is introduced, with some members playing a makeshift game of Australian football. All the while, the exercisers continue their work-out routine. It is not until the main exerciser (and presumably host of the show) knocks and spills one TISM members' beer, that the band becomes hostile towards the presenter, whom they drag to the ground and severely beat and kick as pandemonium overcomes the video, the director calls cut and a TISM member covers the camera lens with his hand, ending the clip.

== Track listing ==
CD single (Genre B.Goode – GOO11)

1. "Whatareya" – 3:36
2. "Untz... Untz... Untz... Untz... Untz... Untz... Untz... Untz... Untz... Untz... Untz... Untz... Untz... Untz... Untz... Untz... Untz... Untz... Untz... Untz... Untz... Untz... Untz... Untz... Untz... Untz... Untz... Untz... Untz... Untz... Untz... Untz... Untz... Untz... Untz... Untz... Untz... Untz... Untz... Untz... Untz... Untz... Untz... Untz... Untz... Untz... Untz... Untz... Untz... Untz... Untz... Untz... Untz... Untz... Untz... Untz... Untz... Untz... Untz... Untz... Untz... Untz... Untz... Untz... Untz... Untz... Untz... Untz... Untz... Untz... Untz... Untz... Untz... Untz... Untz... Untz... Untz... Untz... Untz... Untz... Untz... Untz... Untz... Untz... Untz... Untz... Untz... Untz... Untz... Untz... Untz... Untz... Untz... Untz... Untz... Untz... Untz... Untz... Untz... Untz... Untz..." – 3:22
3. "I'd Be Happier if I Was More Depressed" – 3:28
4. "Whatareya (Gratuitous Profanity Carelessly Slapped Into Verse With Spurious Artistic Merit and No Conceivable Motivation Other Than a Deliberately Perverse Desire to Shoot Oneself in the Foot-less Mix)" – 3:34

== Charts ==
Chart performance for "Whatareya?"
Chart (1998)	Peak position
Australia (ARIA)	66
