= The Winker's Song (Misprint) =

1978 song by Ivor Biggun

Song by Ivor Biggun and the Red Nosed Burglars

from the album The Winker's Album (Misprint)
- Published: 1978
- Released: 2 September 1978
- Genre: Comedy; novelty
- Label: Beggars Banquet Records
- Songwriter: Doc Cox

"The Winker's Song (Misprint)", also known as "The Wanker's Song" and "I'm a Wanker", is a 1978 comedy song written and performed by British musician Doc Cox under the pseudonym of "Ivor Biggun and the Red Nosed Burglars". The song was released as a single by Beggars Banquet Records on 2 September 1978, reaching number 22 on the UK Singles Chart despite not being aired on the radio due to its references to masturbation.

== History ==
Doc Cox signed with the British independent record label Beggars Banquet in 1978. "The Winker's Song" was released as a single later that year; the song's original title was "The Wanker's Song", but this was altered to "The Winker's Song (Misprint)" because of fears that shops would not stock it. The song did not receive airplay on national radio stations, and was banned by the BBC for its subject matter. However, it received popular attention after Johnny Rotten endorsed it as a "definite buy" in an issue of New Musical Express that he guest edited.

The song entered the UK Singles Chart at number 68, remaining in the charts for twelve weeks. It peaked at number 22 on 1 October 1978, becoming Beggars Banquet's first UK Top 40 hit. It was later released on the album The Winker's Album (Misprint).

Musically, "The Winker's Song" has been compared to the style of George Formby.

The song has continued to be played into modern times; it has been used to clear the dance floor at nightclubs in Ibiza and Brighton. In the summer of 2017, Mansfield 103.2 FM in Mansfield, Nottinghamshire, was subjected to repeated broadcast signal intrusions playing the song.
