= It Mek =

Single by Desmond Dekker & The Aces
- B-side: "Problems"
- Released: June 1969
- Recorded: 1968
- Genre: Reggae; rocksteady
- Length: 2:20
- Label: Pyramid Records – PYR 6068
- Songwriter: Desmond Dekker/Leslie Kong
- Producer: Leslie Kong

Desmond Dekker & The Aces singles chronology
"Israelites" (1969)	"It Mek" (1969)	"Pickney Gal" (1970)

It Mek (sometimes appearing as "A It Mek" or German "It Miek") was a 1969 hit song by the Jamaican musicians Desmond Dekker & the Aces. After being re-released in June 1969, the single reached number 7 in the UK Singles Chart. The track was written by Dekker (under his real name of Desmond Dacres) and his record producer, Leslie Kong, and was recorded in Jamaica with the brass accompaniment added in the UK. It spent eleven weeks in the UK chart, and by September 1970 had sold over a million copies worldwide. A gold record was presented by Ember Records, the distributors of Dekker's recordings.

The song's title is Jamaican patois meaning "that's why" or "that's the reason." According to the liner notes for the Dekker compilation album Rockin' Steady – The Best of Desmond Dekker the phrase was also used as a schoolyard taunt roughly meaning "that's what you get." This was the sense used in the song's lyrics, which metaphorically tell of the problems that happens when someone (such as a lover) goes too far.

== Charts ==
=== Weekly charts ===
Chart (1969)	Peak position
Austria (Ö3 Austria Top 40)	15
Belgium (Ultratop 50 Flanders)	12
Belgium (Ultratop 50 Wallonia)	37
Germany (GfK)	17
Netherlands (Single Top 100)	12
South Africa (Springbok Radio)	17
UK Singles (Official Charts)	7

=== Year-end charts ===
Chart (1969)	Position
UK Singles (Official Charts Company)	84
