= Fred E. Cliffe =

English songwriter (1885–1957)

Frederick Cliffe Howchin (11 April 1885 – 22 September 1957), known professionally as Fred E. Cliffe, was an English songwriter, best known for his work co-writing songs with Harry Gifford for entertainer George Formby.

He was born in Liverpool, and by 1907 had started working in music halls as a lightning sketch artist. He moved to London, and by 1910 was working as a songwriter with Fred Godfrey and others. His greatest period of success as a writer came in the 1930s, when he teamed up with Harry Gifford to write some of George Formby's most popular songs. These include "Fanlight Fanny" (1935), "With My Little Stick of Blackpool Rock" (1936), "When I'm Cleaning Windows" (1937), "It’s Turned Out Nice Again" (1939), and "Mr. Wu’s a Window Cleaner Now" (1939), some of which also included Formby's name as a co-writer.

He was married three times, and died in hospital in Taplow, Buckinghamshire, in 1957, aged 72, from myocardial infarction and coronary thrombosis.
