= Judge Dread =

English reggae and ska musician (1945–1998)

Background information
- Also known as: Judge Dread; Jason Sinclair; Jamie Kent; JD Alex
- Born: Alexander Minto Hughes; 2 May 1945
- Origin: Snodland, Kent, England
- Died: 13 March 1998 (aged 52) Canterbury, Kent, England
- Genres: Ska; reggae; rocksteady; comedy
- Instrument: Vocals

Alexander Minto Hughes (2 May 1945 – 13 March 1998), better known as Judge Dread, was an English reggae and ska musician. He was the first white recording artist to have a reggae hit in Jamaica, and the BBC has banned more of his songs from radio and television than those of any other recording artist, because of his frequent use of sexual innuendo and double entendres. Following his death, Rolling Stone reported, "He sold several million albums throughout his 25-plus year career and was second only to Bob Marley in U.K. reggae sales during the 1970s".

== Early life ==
Hughes was born on 2 May 1945. He was introduced to Jamaican music when he lodged as a teenager in a West Indian household in Brixton, South West London. Hughes, a heavy-set man, met Jamaican artists Derrick Morgan and Prince Buster through his job as a bouncer at London nightclubs such as the Ram Jam in Brixton; and through another job as a bodyguard. After working as a professional wrestler (under the name "The Masked Executioner") and as a debt collector for Trojan Records, he worked as a DJ on local radio. In the 1960s he was also sometimes employed to provide security to The Rolling Stones.

== Music career ==
When Prince Buster had an underground hit in 1969 with "Big 5", Hughes capitalized on it with the recording of his own "Big Six", based on Verne & Son's "Little Boy Blue", which was picked up by Trojan boss Lee Gopthal, and released on Trojan's 'Big Shot' record label under the stage name Judge Dread, the name taken from another of Prince Buster's songs. According to The Independent, this came about after he played the track to Trojan Records' production team in 1972: one of the team, Joe Sinclair, later recalled: "When Dread brought in his demo, we didn't exactly think it was a national hit but we reckoned we could pick up something around the region of 70,000 sales with the help of a change of title. You see, the Judge called it 'Little Boy Blue', whereas I thought 'Big Six' would create interest by making the association with Prince Buster's 'Big Five' more obvious. It sold 300,000 copies and spent 27 weeks in the British charts. In 1973, it even made No 1 in Africa." "Big Six" reached No. 11 in the UK Singles Chart in 1972, selling over 300,000 copies and spending six months on the chart, despite getting no radio airplay due to its lyrics. Further hit singles followed with "Big Seven" (co-written by Rupie Edwards) and "Big Eight" – both following the pattern of lewd versions of nursery rhymes over a reggae backing – as well as "Y Viva Suspenders" and "Up with the Cock".

He was the first white recording artist to have a reggae hit in Jamaica, leading him to travel to Jamaica to perform live, where many were surprised that he was white. Dread had 11 UK chart hits in the 1970s, which was more than any other reggae artist (including Bob Marley). The Guinness Book of World Records credited Judge Dread for having the highest number (eleven) of banned songs of all time. Several of his songs mentioned Snodland, the small town in Kent where Judge Dread lived, including "The Belle of Snodland Town". There is a road in the town of Snodland named after him, Alex Hughes Close.

Judge Dread was also a songwriter, coming to the attention of Elvis Presley, who had planned to record "A Child's Prayer" as a Christmas gift to his daughter Lisa Marie in 1977, but died before the scheduled recording date. Dread helped organise a benefit concert featuring The Wailers and Desmond Dekker and released a benefit single titled "Molly". Despite its lack of innuendo in the lyrics, the track was still banned from radio airplay, and failed to chart. Recordings Dread issued under the pseudonyms JD Alex and Jason Sinclair were banned by the BBC.

== Death ==
Judge Dread died from a heart attack as he walked off stage after performing at The Penny Theatre in Canterbury on 13 March 1998. According to The Times his last reported words were: "Let's hear it for the band!" When he collapsed, the audience at first thought that this was part of the act. An off-duty paramedic in the crowd realised that it was not and attempted resuscitation; shortly afterwards Dread was taken to the Kent and Canterbury Hospital where he was pronounced dead.

== Legacy ==
Writing in The Independent following Dread's death, Pierre Perrone noted: "His stage act, mixing vaudeville, music hall, single entendres, and damn-right cheek was undoubtedly a major influence on Ian Dury (check out "Razzle in My Pocket", the B side of "Sex and Drugs and Rock and Roll") and Buster Bloodvessel, who used to end Bad Manners' shows by baring his huge buttocks; a very Judge Dread move indeed".

== Discography ==
=== Albums ===
Year	Album	Label	UK
1972	Dreadmania: It's All in the Mind	Trojan	—
1974	Working Class 'Ero	Trojan	—
1975	Bedtime Stories	Creole	26
1976	Last of the Skinheads	Cactus	—
1977	40 Big Ones	Creole	51
1980	Reggae and Ska (Germany only)	Cargo Records	—
1981	Rub a Dub	Creole	—
1984	Not Guilty	Creole	—
1988	Live and Lewd	Skank	—
1989	King of Rudeness	Skank	—
1994	Never Mind Up with the Cock, Here's Judge Dread	Tring	—
1996	Ska'd for Life	Magnum	—
1996	Dread White and Blue	Magnum	—
"—" denotes releases that did not chart.

=== EPs ===
Year	Title	Tracks	UK
1977	5th Anniversary (EP)	Jamaica Jerk (Off); Bring Back The Skins; End of the World; Big Everything	31
1979	The Big One (EP)	The Big One; Big Six; Big Seven; Big Eight	—

=== Singles ===
Year	A-side	B-side	UK
1972	"Big Six"	"One Armed Bandit"	11
1972	"Big Seven"	"Dread"	8
1973	"Big Eight"	"Mind the Doors"	14
1973	"Big One"	"Oh! She Is a Big Girl Now"	—
1973	"Molly"	"Dr. Kitch"	—
1974	"Big Nine"	"Nine and a Bit Skank"	—
1974	"Grandad's Flanalette Nightshirt"	"Dance of the Snods"	—
1974	"(Hey There) Lonely Girl"	"Grass-Hopper"	—
1975	"Je t'aime... moi non-plus"	"Look a Pussy"	9
1975	"Big Ten"	"What Kung Fu Dat"	14
1975	"Christmas in Dreadland"	"Come Outside"	14
1976	"The Winkle Man"	"Rudeness Train"	35
1976	"Y Viva Suspenders"	"Confessions of a Bouncer"	27
1978	"Up With the Cock!"	"Big Punk"	49
1978	"Dread Rock"	"This Little Piece of Dinkle"	—
1978	"The Hokey Cokey"	"Jingle Bells"	64
1979	"The Touch"	"Going Down"	—
1979	"Lover's Rock"	"Ska Fever"	—
1980	"Will I What?"	"Last Tango in Snodland"	—
1981	"Hello Baby"	"One-Eyed Lodger"	—
1981	"Rub-a-Dub"	"The Dread Stakes"	—
1982	"My Name's Dick"	"The World Is Burning"	—
1983	"The Ten Commandments"	"Give It Up Michael"	—
1983	"Not Guilty"	"Merry Christmas Mr. Dread"	—
1984	"Relax"	"It's a Foolish Way"	76
1985	"Lost in Rudeness"	"Blow Your Whistle"	—
1985	"Big Seven '85"	"King Dong"	—
1987	"Jerk Your Body"	"Bring Back the Skins"	—
1996	"The Ballad of Judge Dread"	"On the Beach (Rude Mix)"	—
"—" denotes releases that did not chart.

== See also ==
- List of reggae musicians
- List of people from Kent
- Trojan skinhead
- Record Mirror
- Caribbean music in the United Kingdom
