= Israelites (song) =

1968 single by Desmond Dekker & The Aces

Single by Desmond Dekker & the Aces

from the album The Israelites
- B-side: "My Precious World (The Man)" by Beverley's All Stars
- Released: December 1968
- Recorded: 1968
- Genre: Ska, reggae
- Length: 2:47
- Label: Pyramid - PYR 6058 (UK); Uni 55129 (USA)
- Songwriters: Desmond Dekker and Leslie Kong
- Producer: Leslie Kong

Desmond Dekker & the Aces singles chronology
| "007 (Shanty Town)" (1967) | "Israelites" (1968) | "It Miek" (1969) |

"Israelites" is a song written by Desmond Dekker and Leslie Kong for their group, Desmond Dekker & the Aces, which reached the top of the charts in numerous countries in 1969. Sung in Jamaican Patois, some of the song's lyrics were not readily understood by many British and American listeners at the time of its release. Despite this, the single was the first UK reggae #1 and among the first to reach the US top ten (peaking at #9). It combined the Rastafarian religion with rude boy concerns, to make what has been described by Allmusic as a "timeless masterpiece that knew no boundaries".

== Song ==
=== Origin and lyrics ===
Originally issued in Jamaica as "Poor Me Israelites", it remains the best known Jamaican reggae hit to reach the United States Hot 100's top 10, and was written almost two years after Dekker first made his mark with the rude boy song "007 (Shanty Town)". Dekker composed the song after overhearing an argument: "I was walking in the park, eating popcorn. I heard a couple arguing about money. She was saying she needs money and he was saying the work he was doing was not giving him enough. I related to those things and began to sing a little song: 'You get up in the morning and you're slaving for bread.' By the time I got home, it was complete." The title has been the source of speculation, but most settle on the Rastafarian Movement's claimed ancestry with the ancient Israelites. In the 1960s, Jamaican Rastafarians were largely marginalized as "cultish" and ostracized from the larger society, including by the more conservative Christian church in Kingston. Destitute ("slaving for bread") and unkempt ("Shirt dem a-tear up, trousers a-gone"), some Rastafarians were tempted to a life of crime ("I don't want to end up like Bonnie and Clyde"). The song is a lament of this condition.

=== Musical structure ===
The vocal melody is syncopated and centred on the tone of B flat. The chords of the guitar accompaniment are played on the offbeat and move through the tonic chord [B flat], the subdominant [E flat], the dominant [F], and the occasional [D flat], viz, [B flat] - [E flat] - [F] - [B flat] - [D flat]. It was one of the first reggae songs to become an international hit, despite Dekker's strong Jamaican accent which made his lyrics difficult for many listeners to understand outside of Jamaica.

=== Impact ===
Despite "Israelites" being recorded and released in 1968, the Uni 45 discography shows its copyright as 1969. In June 1969, the record reached the Top Ten in the United States, peaking at #9 on the Billboard Hot 100 singles chart. "Israelites" hit #1 in the United Kingdom, the Netherlands, Jamaica and West Germany.

"Israelites" brought a Jamaican beat to the British top 40 for the first time since Dekker's #14 hit "007 (Shanty Town)" in 1967.

The disc was released in the UK in March 1969 and was #1 for one week, selling over 250,000 copies. A global million sales was reported in June 1969.

=== Follow-up and reissues ===
Dekker had two more UK Top 10 hits over the next year, "It Miek" and his cover of Jimmy Cliff's song "You Can Get It If You Really Want".

Dekker recorded on the Pyramid record label, and when its catalogue was acquired by Cactus Records in 1975, "Israelites" was re-issued in a first-time stereo mix. Just over six years after the original release, the song again reached a Top Ten position in the United Kingdom.

In 1980, Dekker released a new recording of the song on UK label Stiff Records, performed in an uptempo Two Tone style. It was taken from an album of similar re-recordings of his old hits, Black & Dekker.

=== Appearance in other media ===
The song has appeared in numerous movies and television programs, including the soundtracks of the 1989 American film Drugstore Cowboy and the 2010 British film Made in Dagenham.

On November 3, 2019, "Israelites" was prominently featured in the third episode of HBO's Watchmen. The song charted again, entering the Billboard Digital Reggae Song Sales Chart at #2.

In 1989 the song was used as part of an advertising campaign by Hitachi’s Maxell tapes brand. The concept for the campaign was based on the tendency for pop lyrics to be unintelligible and comically misunderstood. A reggae fan holds up a number of boards as the music plays, upon which the misheard lyrics are written. For example, the line in the chorus "The Israelites" the handwritten board reads "Me ears are alight".

The final two cards read "At least I think that's what he said – but I need to hear it on a Maxell."

== Charts ==
=== Weekly charts ===
| Chart (1969) | Peak position |
|---|---|
| Australia (Go-Set) | 3 |
| Australia (Kent Music Report) | 5 |
| Austria (Ö3 Austria Top 40) | 2 |
| Belgium (Ultratop 50 Flanders) | 3 |
| Belgium (Ultratop 50 Wallonia) | 8 |
| Canada Top Singles (RPM) | 9 |
| Ireland (IRMA) | 7 |
| Netherlands (Single Top 100) | 1 |
| New Zealand (Listener) | 7 |
| South Africa (Springbok Radio) | 12 |
| Sweden (Kvällstoppen) | 2 |
| Switzerland (Schweizer Hitparade) | 6 |
| UK Singles (Official Charts) | 1 |
| US Billboard Hot 100 | 9 |
| US Cash Box Top 100 | 8 |
| West Germany (GfK) | 1 |

| Chart (1975) | Peak position |
|---|---|
| UK Singles (Official Charts) | 10 |

=== Year-end charts ===
| Chart (1969) | Position |
|---|---|
| Australia (Kent Music Report) | 60 |
| Belgium (Ultratop 50 Flanders) | 21 |

== Certifications ==
| Region | Certification | Certified units/sales |
|---|---|---|
| United Kingdom (BPI) | Silver | 200,000^{‡} |
^{‡} Sales+streaming figures based on certification alone.

== See also ==
- UK No.1 Hits of 1969
- List of number-one singles from the 1960s (UK)
- Number-one hits of 1969 (Germany)
- List of 1960s one-hit wonders in the United States
- Dutch Top 40 number-one hits of 1969

== Bibliography ==
- Joel Whitburn's Top Pop Singles 1955-1990 - ISBN 0-89820-089-X
