= Desmond Dekker =

Jamaican musician (1941–2006)

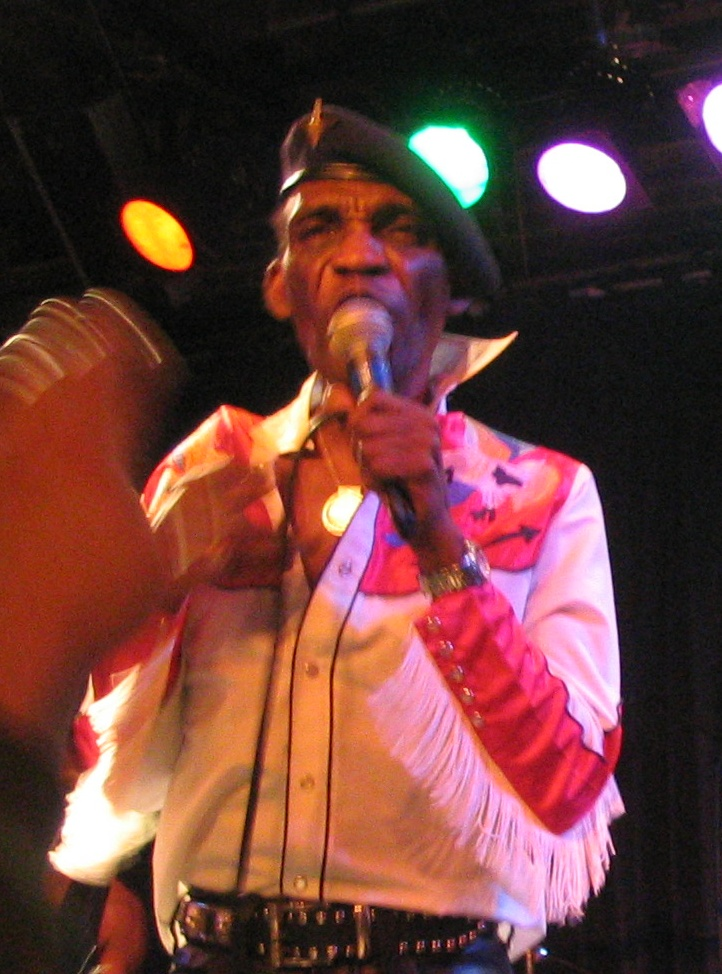
- Dekker performing in San Francisco, California, on 22 April 2005

Background information
- Born: Desmond Adolphus Dacres; 16 July 1941; Saint Andrew Parish, Colony of Jamaica
- Died: 25 May 2006 (aged 64) London, England
- Genres: Ska; rocksteady; reggae
- Occupations: Singer-songwriter; musician
- Instrument: Vocals
- Years active: 1963–2006
- Labels: Island; Rhino; Pyramid; Trojan; Cactus; Secret Records; Burning Sounds; Stiff
- Website: desmonddekker.com

Desmond Dekker (born Desmond Adolphus Dacres; 16 July 1941 – 25 May 2006) was a Jamaican singer/songwriter and musician considered a pioneer in the ska, rocksteady and reggae genres. Together with his backing group the Aces (consisting of Wilson James and Easton Barrington Howard), he had one of the earliest international reggae hits with "Israelites" (1968). Other hits include "007 (Shanty Town)" (1967), "It Mek" (1969) and "You Can Get It If You Really Want" (1970).

== Early life ==
Desmond Adolphus Dacres was born in Saint Andrew Parish (Greater Kingston), Jamaica, on 16 July 1941. Dekker spent his formative years in Kingston. From a young age he regularly attended the local church with his grandmother and aunt. This early religious upbringing, as well as Dekker's enjoyment of singing hymns, led to a lifelong religious commitment. Following his mother's death, he moved to the parish of St. Mary and later to St. Thomas. While at St. Thomas, Dekker embarked on an apprenticeship as a tailor before returning to Kingston, where he became a welder. His workplace singing had drawn the attention of his co-workers, who encouraged him to pursue a career in music.

In 1961 he auditioned for Coxsone Dodd (Studio One) and Duke Reid (Treasure Isle), though neither audition was successful. The unsigned vocalist then auditioned for Leslie Kong's Beverley's record label and was awarded his first recording contract.

== Career ==
Despite achieving a record deal, it was two years before Dekker saw his first record released. Meanwhile, Dekker spotted the talent of Bob Marley, a fellow welder, and brought the youth to Kong's attention. In 1962 "Judge Not" and "One Cup Of Coffee" became the first recorded efforts of Marley, who retained gratitude, respect and admiration for Dekker for the rest of his life. Eventually in 1963 Kong chose "Honour Your Mother and Father" (written by Dekker and the song that Dekker had sung in his Kong audition two years earlier), which became a Jamaican hit and established Dekker's musical career. and "Labour for Learning". It was during this period that Desmond Dacres adopted the stage-name of Desmond Dekker. His fourth hit, "King of Ska" (backing vocals by The Cherrypies, also known as the Maytals), made him into one of the island's biggest stars. Dekker then recruited four brothers, Carl, Patrick, Clive and Barry Howard, as his permanent backing vocalists to perform with him under the name Desmond Dekker and the Aces.

The new group recorded a number of Jamaican hits, including "Parents", "Get Up Edina", "This Woman" and "Mount Zion". The themes of Dekker's songs during the first four years of his career dealt with the moral, cultural and social issues of mainstream Jamaican culture: respect for one's parents ("Honour Your Mother and Father"), religious morality ("Sinners, Prepare") and education ("Labour for Learning"). In 1967 he appeared on Derrick Morgan's "Tougher Than Tough", which helped begin a trend of popular songs commenting on the rude boy subculture which was rooted in Jamaican ghetto life where opportunities for advancement were limited and life was economically difficult. Dekker's own songs did not go to the extremes of many other popular rude boy songs, which reflected the violence and social problems associated with ghetto life, though he did introduce lyrics that resonated with the rude boys, starting with one of his best-known songs, "007 (Shanty Town)". The song established Dekker as a rude boy icon in Jamaica and also became a favourite dance track for the young working-class men and women of the United Kingdom's mod scene. "007 (Shanty Town)" was a top 15 hit in the UK and his UK concerts were attended by a large following of mods wherever he played.

Dekker continued to release rude boy songs such as "Rude Boy Train" and "Rudie Got Soul", as well as mainstream cultural songs like "It's a Shame", "Wise Man", "Hey Grandma", "Unity", "If It Pays", "Mother's Young Girl", "Sabotage" and "Pretty Africa". Many of the hits from this era came from his debut album, 007 (Shanty Town).

In 1968 Dekker's "Israelites" was released, eventually topping the UK Singles Chart in April 1969 and peaking in the top ten of the US Billboard Hot 100 in June 1969. Dekker was the first Jamaican artist to have a hit record in the US with Jamaican-style music, other than Millie Small, who had a hit with Jamaican style music in 1964. Ironically although he went to worldwide fame his former welding colleague Marley never had a UK number one. That same year saw the release of "Beautiful and Dangerous", "Writing on the Wall", "Music Like Dirt (Intensified '68)" (which won the 1968 Jamaica Independence Festival Song Contest), "Bongo Girl" and "Shing a Ling". 1969 saw the release of "It Mek", which became a hit both in Jamaica and the UK. Dekker also released "Problems" and "Pickney Gal", both of which were popular in Jamaica, although only "Pickney Gal" managed to chart in the UK top 50.

=== 1970s ===
In 1970 Dekker released "You Can Get It If You Really Want", written by Jimmy Cliff, which reached No. 2 in the UK chart. Dekker was initially reluctant to record the track but was eventually persuaded to do so by Leslie Kong. Dekker's version uses the same backing track as Cliff's original. Kong, whose music production skills had been a crucial part of both Dekker's and Cliff's careers, died in 1971, affecting the careers of both artists for a short period of time. In 1972 the rude boy film The Harder They Come was released and Dekker's "007 (Shanty Town)" was featured on the soundtrack along with Cliff's version of "You Can Get It If You Really Want", as well as other Jamaican artists' hits, giving reggae more international exposure and preparing the way for Bob Marley.

In 1975 "Israelites" was re-released and became a UK top 10 hit for a second time. Dekker had also begun working on new material with the production duo Bruce Anthony in 1974. In 1975 this collaboration resulted in the release of "Sing a Little Song", which charted in the UK top twenty; this was to be his last UK hit.

=== 1980s and later ===
The 1980s found Dekker signed to a new label, Stiff Records, an independent label that specialized in punk and new wave acts as well as releases associated with the 2 Tone label, whose acts instigated a short-lived but influential ska revival. He recorded an album called Black & Dekker (1980), which featured his previous hits backed by The Rumour, Graham Parker's backing band and Akrylykz (featuring Roland Gift, later of Fine Young Cannibals). A re-recorded version of "Israelites" was released in 1980 on the Stiff label, followed by other new recordings: Jimmy Cliff's "Many Rivers to Cross" and "Book of Rules". Dekker's next album, Compass Point (1981), was produced by Robert Palmer. Despite declining sales, Dekker remained a popular live performer and continued to tour with The Rumour.

Only a single live album was released in the late 1980s. In 1990 "Israelites" was used in a Maxell TV advert that became popular and brought the song and artist back to the attention of the general public. He collaborated with the Specials on the 1993 album, King of Kings, which was released under Desmond Dekker and the Specials. King of Kings consists of songs by Dekker's musical heroes including Byron Lee; Theophilus Beckford, Jimmy Cliff, and his friend and fellow Kong label artist, Derrick Morgan. He also collaborated on a remix of "Israelites" with reggae artist Apache Indian. In 2003 a reissue of The Harder They Come soundtrack featured "Israelites" and "007 (Shanty Town)". Desmond headlined Jools Holland's 2003 Annual Hootenanny.

== Personal life and death ==
In 1969, Dekker took permanent residency in the UK. In 1984, he was declared bankrupt.

Dekker died of a heart attack on 25 May 2006, at his home in Thornton Heath in the London Borough of Croydon, England, aged 64, and was buried at Streatham Park Cemetery. He was preparing to headline The World Music Festival in Prague. Dekker was divorced and was survived by his son Desmond Dekker Jr and daughter Desrene Dekker.

== Tribute band ==
The 2006 to 2015 line-up for Dekker's backing band, The Aces, who are still performing tribute concerts, includes:

- Delroy Williams – backing vocals/M.C.
- Gordon Mulrain – bass guitarist and session musician (Mulrain, also known as "Innerheart", is co-founder of the British record label Ambiel Music)
- Aubrey Mulrain – keyboard player and session musician
- Steve Roberts – guitarist and session musician (also a member of the British band Dubzone)
- Learoy Green – drums and session musician
- Stan Samuel – guitarist and session musician
- Charles Nelson – keyboard player and session musician

This particular line-up also recorded with Dekker on some of his later studio sessions in the 1990s.

The 2016 to present line-up of musicians for Desmond Dekker's band the Aces featuring Delroy Williams & Guests:

- Delroy Williams – vocals (also featuring guests Winston 'Mr Fix It' Francis and Glenroy Oakley from Greyhound 'Black & White')
- Gordon Mulrain – bass guitarist and session musician
- Aubrey Mulrain – keyboard player and session musician
- Learoy Green – drums, backing vocals and session musician
- Bryan Campbell – keyboard player and session musician
- Steve Baker – guitarist, backing vocals, peripatetic guitar teacher and session guitarist. Also founder and MD of reggae and ska tribute/backing band Zeb Rootz
- Paul Abraham – guitarist and backing vocals

== Discography ==
=== Albums ===
==== Studio albums ====
- 007 Shanty Town (1967) – Doctor Bird (Desmond Dekker & the Aces)
- Action! (1968) (Desmond Dekker & the Aces)
- The Israelites (1969) – Pyramid, reached No. 153 in the United States
- Intensified (1970) – Lagoon
- You Can Get It If You Really Want (1970) – Trojan
- The Israelites (1975), Cactus – completely different album from the 1969 release
- Black and Dekker (1980) – Stiff
- Compass Point (1981) – Stiff
- King of Kings with The Specials (1993) – Trojan Records
- Halfway to Paradise (1999) – Trojan
- In Memoriam 1941 – CD Album – (2007) Secret Records
- King of Ska – Red Vinyl (2019) Burning Sounds

==== Compilation albums ====
- This Is Desmond Dekkar (1969) – Trojan Records (UK #27), reissued on CD in 2006 with 19 bonus tracks
- Double Dekker (1973) – Trojan. Reissued on Music on Vinyl February 16, 2022
- Dekker's Sweet 16 Hits (1979) – Trojan
- The Original Reggae Hitsound (1985) – Trojan
- 20 Golden Pieces of Desmond Dekker (1987) – Bulldog
- The Official Live and Rare (1987) – Trojan
- Greatest Hits (1988) – Streetlife
- The Best of & the Rest Of (1990) – Action Replay
- Music Like Dirt (1992) – Trojan
- Rockin' Steady – The Best of Desmond Dekker (1992) – Rhino
- Crucial Cuts (1993) – Music Club
- Israelites (1994) – Laserlight
- Action (1995) – Lagoon
- Voice of Ska (1995) – Emporio
- Moving On (1996) – Trojan
- The Israelites (1996) – Marble Arch
- First Time for a Long Time (1997) – Trojan
- Desmond Dekker Archive (1997) – Rialto
- The Writing on the Wall (1998) – Trojan
- Israelites (1999) – Castle Pie
- Israelites: The Best of Desmond Dekker (1963–1971) – Trojan (1999)
- The Very Best Of (2000) – Jet Set
- Israelites – Anthology 1963 to 1999 (2001) – Trojan
- 007 – The Best of Desmond Dekker (2011) – Trojan
- Live – Live at Dingwalls (2021) – Secret

=== Singles ===
Year	Title	Peak chart positions		Certifications
Year	Title	US	UK	Certifications
As Desmond Dekker and the Aces
1967	"007 (Shanty Town)"	―	14	
1967	"Unity"	―	―	
1967	"Sabotage"	―	―	
1967	"It Pays"	―	―	
1968	"Beautiful and Dangerous"	―	―	
1968	"Bongo Gal"	―	―	
1968	"Mother Pepper"	―	―	
1968	"Hey Grandma"	―	―	
1968	"Israelites"	9	1	BPI: Silver
1968	"Christmas Day"	―	―	
1969	"It Mek"	―	7	
1969	"Pickney Gal"	―	42	
As Desmond Dekker
1970	"You Can Get It If You Really Want"	103	2	
1970	"The Song We Used to Sing"	―	―	
1971	"Licking Stick"	―	―	
1972	"Beware"	―	―	
1973	"It Gotta Be So"	―	―	
1973	"Everybody Join Hands"	―	―	
1974	"Busted Lad"	―	―	
1975	"Israelites" (re-recording)	―	10	
1975	"Sing a Little Song"	―	16	
1977	"Roots Rock"	―	―	
1980	"Israelites" (new mix)	―	―	
1980	"Please Don't Bend"	―	―	
1980	"Many Rivers to Cross"	―	―	
1981	"That's My Woman"	―	―	
1982	"Book of Rules"	―	―	
1983	"Hot City"	―	―	
1985	"Good Loving"	―	―	
1988	"Do It Right"	―	―	
1993	"Jamaica Ska" (with the Specials)	―	―	
1996	"Wonderful World"	―	―	
2005	"The Israelites '05" (with Apache Indian)	―	―	
"—" denotes releases that did not chart.
