= List of cover versions of Michael Jackson songs =

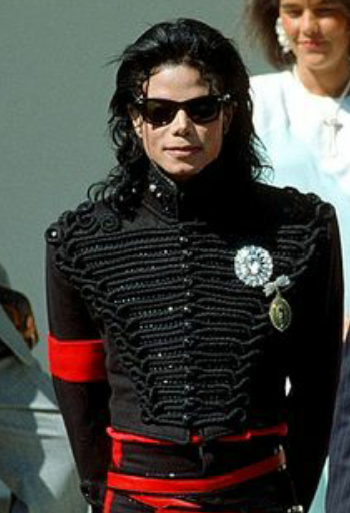
Jackson in 1990

This is a list of cover versions by notable music artists who have recorded one or more songs recorded by American singer Michael Jackson. Many notable artists began covering his songs since his debut in the early 1970s. These covers are in several different languages and genres, and some have received positive reviews from music critics and featured on record charts. Artists who have covered songs from The Jackson 5 career are not included.

Artist	Song	Year	Release
2Cellos	"Human Nature"	2011	2Cellos
2Cellos	"Smooth Criminal"	2011	2Cellos
2Cellos	"They Don't Care About Us"	2015	Celloverse
98 Degrees	"She's Out of My Life"	1998	98 Degrees and Rising
Adam Rafferty	"I Want You Back"	2011	I Remember Michael
Adam Rafferty	"Rock with You"	2011	I Remember Michael
Adam Rafferty	"Human Nature"	2011	I Remember Michael
Adam Rafferty	"The Way You Make Me Feel"	2011	I Remember Michael
Adam Rafferty	"I'll Be There"	2011	I Remember Michael
Adam Rafferty	"Thriller"	2011	I Remember Michael
Adam Rafferty	"Liberian Girl"	2011	I Remember Michael
Adam Rafferty	"ABC"	2011	I Remember Michael
Adam Rafferty	"Ben"	2011	I Remember Michael
Adam Rafferty	"Don't Stop 'Til You Get Enough"	2011	I Remember Michael
Adam Rafferty	"The Lady in My Life"	2011	I Remember Michael
Adam Rafferty	"Billie Jean"	2011	I Remember Michael
Adam Rafferty	"She's Out of My Life"	2011	I Remember Michael
Adam Rafferty	"Off the Wall"	2011	I Remember Michael
Adam Rafferty	"Man in the Mirror"	2011	I Remember Michael
Andrew Bissell	"Rock with You"	2013	Rockabye Baby! Lullaby Renditions of Michael Jackson
Andrew Bissell	"ABC"	2013	Rockabye Baby! Lullaby Renditions of Michael Jackson
Andrew Bissell	"Don't Stop 'Til You Get Enough"	2013	Rockabye Baby! Lullaby Renditions of Michael Jackson
Andrew Bissell	"The Way You Make Me Feel"	2013	Rockabye Baby! Lullaby Renditions of Michael Jackson
Andrew Bissell	"Beat It"	2013	Rockabye Baby! Lullaby Renditions of Michael Jackson
Andrew Bissell	"Thriller"	2013	Rockabye Baby! Lullaby Renditions of Michael Jackson
Andrew Bissell	"Billie Jean"	2013	Rockabye Baby! Lullaby Renditions of Michael Jackson
Andrew Bissell	"Smooth Criminal"	2013	Rockabye Baby! Lullaby Renditions of Michael Jackson
Andrew Bissell	"P.Y.T. (Pretty Young Thing)"	2013	Rockabye Baby! Lullaby Renditions of Michael Jackson
Andrew Bissell	"Remember the Time"	2013	Rockabye Baby! Lullaby Renditions of Michael Jackson
Andrew Bissell	"Man in the Mirror"	2013	Rockabye Baby! Lullaby Renditions of Michael Jackson
Andrew Bissell	"You Are Not Alone"	2013	Rockabye Baby! Lullaby Renditions of Michael Jackson
Andrew Bissell	"Heal the World"	2013	Rockabye Baby! Lullaby Renditions of Michael Jackson
Ashanti	"Rock with You"	2003	Coca-Cola Hits 2003
Alien Ant Farm	"Smooth Criminal"	2001	ANThology
Alicia Keys	"We're Almost There"	2009	The Element of Freedom
Aereogramme	"Thriller"	2003	Livers & Lungs EP
Al B. Sure!	"The Lady in My Life"	2009	Honey I'm Home
Ace Young	"Butterflies"	2006	American Idol (season 5)
Ambelique	"Human Nature"	1997	Sings the Classics
Aswad	"We've Got a Good Thing Going"	2002	Cool Summer Reggae
Boyzone	"Ben"	2001	Ballads: the Ultimate Love Song Collection 1993-2001
Blackstreet	"Billie Jean"	2003	No Diggity: The Very Best of Blackstreet
Babyface	"Gone Too Soon"	1997	MTV Unplugged NYC 1997
Beast In Black	"They Don’t Care About Us"	2021	Dark Connection
Big Daddy	"Billie Jean"	1985	Meanwhile...Back In The States
Billie Eilish	"Bad"	2018	Triple J
Boyz II Men	"Got to Be There"	2007	Motown: A Journey Through Hitsville USA
Boyz II Men	"Human Nature"	2004	Throwback, Vol. 1
The Brady Bunch	"Ben"	1972	The Kids from the Brady Bunch
Brandon Rogers	"Rock with You"	2007	American Idol season 6
Boyce Avenue	"Will You Be There"	2010	Influential Sessions 3
Bappi Lahiri	"Billie Jean"	1984	Kasam Paida Karne Wale Ki
Bappi Lahiri	"Thriller"	1984	Kasam Paida Karne Wale Ki
Billy Crawford	"Human Nature"	2009	Groove
Bob Baldwin	"I Wanna Be Where You Are"	2004	Brazil Chill
Bruno Mars	"Dirty Diana"	2010	Project Ethos
Bruno Mars	"Rock with You"	2013	Moonshine Jungle Tour
Bruno Mars	"Beat It"	2013	Moonshine Jungle Tour
Bruno Mars	"Smooth Criminal"	2013	Moonshine Jungle Tour
Bruno Mars	"The Way You Make Me Feel"	2013	Moonshine Jungle Tour
Bruno Mars	"Man in the Mirror"	2013	Moonshine Jungle Tour
Bruno Mars	"Billie Jean"	2013	Moonshine Jungle Tour
Black Ivory	"I Wanna Be Where You Are"	1972	Don't Turn Around
Breathe Carolina	"Billie Jean"	2012	Punk Goes Pop 5
BWB	"Another Part of Me"	2013	Human Nature
BWB	"Billie Jean"	2013	Human Nature
BWB	"Human Nature"	2013	Human Nature
BWB	"Beat It"	2013	Human Nature
BWB	"Who's Lovin' You"	2013	Human Nature
BWB	"She's Out of My Life"	2013	Human Nature
BWB	"Shake Your Body (Down to the Ground)"	2013	Human Nature
BWB	"The Way You Make Me Feel"	2013	Human Nature
BWB	"I Can't Help It"	2013	Human Nature
BWB	"I'll Be There"	2013	Human Nature
BWB	"Man in the Mirror"	2013	Human Nature
Celine Dion	"Bad"	1988	Incognito Tournée tour
Celine Dion	"Man in the Mirror"	2011	Celine - Las Vegas Show
Celine Dion	"Ben"	2011	Celine - Las Vegas Show
Chris Cornell	"Billie Jean"	2007	Carry On
Craig David	"Human Nature"	2011	Millennium Stadium
Chaka Khan	"Got to Be There"	1982	Chaka Khan
Coldplay	"Billie Jean"	2009	Viva la Vida Tour
Carlos Santana	"Smooth Criminal"		LIVE USA
Alvin and the Chipmunks	"Beat It"	1990	Rockin' Through the Decades
Cyril Cinélu	"Ben"	2007	Jusqu'à moi
Cristina D'Avena	"Childhood"	2009	Magia di Natale
Carleen Anderson	"I Wanna Be Where You Are"	2005	Soul Providence
Chico Freeman	"Liberian Girl"	1989	You'll Know When You Get There
Cluster	"Smooth Criminal"	2008	Enjoy the Silence
Caetano Veloso	"Billie Jean"	1994	Caetano Canta
Cosmos	"Billie Jean"	2005	Pa un par
Chiranjeevi	"Thriller"	1985	Donga OST
Cargo	"Rock with You"	2003	Jewel
Connie Talbot	"Ben"	2007	Over the Rainbow
Cui Jian	"Say Say Say"	1985	I'll Tell You in My Dream
Cyrille Aimée	"Off the Wall"	2015	It's A Good Day
Cleopatra	"I Want You Back"	1997	Comin' Atcha
Crispin Glover	"Ben"	2003	Willard
Danny Worsnop	"Man in the Mirror"	2013	Thriller: A Metal Tribute to Michael Jackson
David Mead	"Human Nature"	2004	Indiana
Davina	"I Can't Help It"	1998	Best of Both Worlds
Dick Brave & The Backbeats	"Black or White"	2003	Dick This!
David Foster	"Earth Song"	2011	Io Canto
Duane Stephenson	"You Are Not Alone"	2009	Jackson Lovers
David Garrett	"Smooth Criminal"	2008	Encore
De Smurfen	"They Don't Care About Us"	1996	Party House Hits
D'Influence	"Rock with You"	1998	Rock with You
Donnie Elbert	"I Wanna Be Where You Are"	1972	Stop in the Name of Love
Diana Ross	"Got to Be There"	2009	Touch Me in the Morning: Expanded Edition 2010
The Embarrassment	"Don't Stop 'Til You Get Enough"	1983	Heyday 1979-1983
Elaine Paige	"She's Out of My Life"	1991	Love Can Do That
Emi Hinouchi	"Rock with You"	2003	Crying
Enrico Rava	"Speechless"	2012	Rava on the Dance Floor
Enrico Rava	"They Don't Care About Us"	2012	Rava on the Dance Floor
Enrico Rava	"Thriller"	2012	Rava on the Dance Floor
Enrico Rava	"Privacy"	2012	Rava on the Dance Floor
Enrico Rava	"Smile"	2012	Rava on the Dance Floor
Enrico Rava	"I Just Can't Stop Loving You/Smooth Criminal"	2012	Rava on the Dance Floor
Enrico Rava	"Little Susie"	2012	Rava on the Dance Floor
Enrico Rava	"Blood on the Dance Floor"	2012	Rava on the Dance Floor
Enrico Rava	"History"	2012	Rava on the Dance Floor
Esther Phillips	"We've Got a Good Thing Going"	1981	Good Black Is Hard to Crack
Easy Star All-Stars	"Wanna Be Startin' Somethin'"	2012	Easy Star's Thrillah
Easy Star All-Stars	"Billie Jean"	2012	Easy Star's Thrillah
Easy Star All-Stars	"The Lady in My Life"	2012	Easy Star's Thrillah
Easy Star All-Stars	"Beat It"	2012	Easy Star's Thrillah
Easy Star All-Stars	"The Girl Is Mine"	2012	Easy Star's Thrillah
Easy Star All-Stars	"P.Y.T. (Pretty Young Thing)"	2012	Easy Star's Thrillah
Easy Star All-Stars	"Human Nature"	2012	Easy Star's Thrillah
Easy Star All-Stars	"Baby Be Mine"	2012	Easy Star's Thrillah
Easy Star All-Stars	"Thriller"	2012	Easy Star's Thrillah
Evanescence	"Dirty Diana"	2016	Synthesis Live
Fall Out Boy, John Mayer	"Beat It"	2008	Live in Phoenix
Faith No More	"Ben"	2010	Live in Indio (Coachella)
Faithless	"Billie Jean"	2000	Back to Mine: Faithless
Flying Pickets	"Billie Jean"	1992	The Warning
Floetry	"Butterflies"	2003	Floacism "Live"
Franck Pourcel	"Wanna Be Startin' Somethin'"	2010	Chill N' Michael (Tribute To Michael Jackson)
From Ashes to New	"Beat it"	2021	Quarantine Chronicles vol 3
Myles Frost	"Beat It"	2022	MJ The Musical Cast Recording
Myles Frost	"I'll Be There"	2022	MJ The Musical Cast Recording
Myles Frost	"Stranger in Moscow"	2022	MJ The Musical Cast Recording
Myles Frost	"I Can't Help It	2022	MJ The Musical Cast Recording
Myles Frost	"Wanna Be Startin' Somethin'"	2022	MJ The Musical Cast Recording
Myles Frost	"Billie Jean"	2022	MJ The Musical Cast Recording
Myles Frost	"Smooth Criminal"	2022	MJ The Musical Cast Recording
Myles Frost	"Keep the Faith"	2022	MJ The Musical Cast Recording
Myles Frost	"She's Out of My Life"	2022	MJ The Musical Cast Recording
Myles Frost	"Human Nature"	2022	MJ The Musical Cast Recording
Myles Frost	"Bad"	2022	MJ The Musical Cast Recording
Myles Frost	"Thriller"	2022	MJ The Musical Cast Recording
Christian Wilson	"I Want You Back"	2022	MJ The Musical Cast Recording
Tavon Olds-Sample	"You Can't Win"	2022	MJ The Musical Cast Recording
Tavon Olds-Sample	"Can You Feel It?"	2022	MJ The Musical Cast Recording
Ben Gibbard	"Thriller"	2002	Crocodile Cafe
Gothminister	"Thriller"	2008	Happiness in Darkness
Gangsta's Paradise	"Bad"	2009	Paradise of a Gangster
Gérald De Palmas	"Black or White"	1995	La dernière année
Grover Washington, Jr.	"I Can't Help It"	1980	Skylarkin
Ginuwine	"She's Out of My Life"	1999	100%Ginuwine
Gary Bartz	"I Wanna Be Where You Are"	1972	Juju Street Songs
George Benson	"Got to Be There"	1993	Love Remembers
George Benson	"The Lady in My Life"	2011	Guitar Man
Glee Cast	"P.Y.T. (Pretty Young Thing)"	2011	Glee: The Music, Volume 5
Glee Cast	"Thriller / Heads Will Roll"	2011	Glee: The Music, Volume 5
Gela Guralia	"Earth Song"	2013	Golos (The Voice)
Henry Mancini	"Thriller"	1989	Mancini Rocks The Pops
Ian Brown	"Billie Jean"	2000	Return to the Planet of the Apes
Ian Brown	"Thriller"	2000	Return to the Planet of the Apes
Ice Nine Kills	"Thriller"	2019	The Silver Scream: Final Cut
Isabel Suckling	"You Are Not Alone"	2010	The Choirgirl
Imogen Heap	"Thriller"	2010	Dermot O'Leary present The Saturday Sessions 2
J.Fla	"Billie Jean"	2018	Rose
J.Fla	"Heal The World"	2018	Believer
J.Fla	"Smooth Criminal"	2023	Memories
J.Fla	"Ben"	2023	YouTube upload through her official channel
Isgaard	"Earth Song"	2003	Golden Key
Jaime Hinckson	"Human Nature"	2013	Take Flight
James Morrison	"Man in the Mirror"	2010	The Early Show/Songs for You, Truths for Me
Jennifer Batten	"Wanna Be Startin' Somethin'"	1992	Above Below and Beyond
Jessie J	"Rock with You"	2014	BBC Radio 1Xtra
John Klemmer	"I Can't Help It"	2005	Finesse/Magnificent Madness
Johnny Mathis	"Love Never Felt So Good"	1984	A Special Part of Me
Johnny Mathis	"One Day in Your Life"	1975	Feelings
Julian Coryell	"Don't Stop 'Til You Get Enough"	1997	Duality
Joe Dolce	"Thriller"	2001	Andrew Denton's Musical Challenge
Jon Stevens	"Ben"	2001	Andrew Denton's Musical Challenge
Jette Torp	"Bad"	1995	Finn Nørbygaard & Jette Torp, Musik & Fis
James Chance and the Contortions	"Don't Stop 'Til You Get Enough"	1999	Soul Exorcism
Janis Siegel	"I Can't Help It"	2006	A Thousand Beautiful Things
Josh Groban	"She's Out of My Life"	2003	Closer
James Morrison	"Man in the Mirror"	2008	Songs for You, Truths for Me
J.Viewz	"Smooth Criminal"	2008	The Besides EP
Jason Weaver	"I Wanna Be Where You Are"	1992	The Jacksons: An American Dream
Junior Reid	"Human Nature"	1984	The Original Foreign Mind / Junior Nature
James Last	"Don't Stop 'Til You Get Enough"	1979	The Non Stop Dancing Sound of the 80's
Jesse Powell	"I Can't Help It"	2003	Jesse
Jackiem Joyner	"Off the Wall"	2010	Jackiem Joyner
Jason Derulo	"Human Nature"	2016	Greatest Hits
Jason Derulo	"Billie Jean"	2010	AOL AIM presents: Jason Derülo
José Feliciano	"I Wanna Be Where You Are"	1981	José Feliciano
Janet Kay	"Got to Be There"	1994	For the Love of You
Joey DeFrancesco	"Thriller"	2010	Never Can Say Goodbye: The Music of Michael Jackson
Joey DeFrancesco	"Beat It"	2010	Never Can Say Goodbye: The Music of Michael Jackson
Joey DeFrancesco	"Human Nature"	2010	Never Can Say Goodbye: The Music of Michael Jackson
Joey DeFrancesco	"Rock with You"	2010	Never Can Say Goodbye: The Music of Michael Jackson
Joey DeFrancesco	"She's Out of My Life"	2010	Never Can Say Goodbye: The Music of Michael Jackson
Joey DeFrancesco	"The Way You Make Me Feel"	2010	Never Can Say Goodbye: The Music of Michael Jackson
Joey DeFrancesco	"The Lady in My Life"	2010	Never Can Say Goodbye: The Music of Michael Jackson
Joey DeFrancesco	"Billie Jean"	2010	Never Can Say Goodbye: The Music of Michael Jackson
JJ Lin	"I Just Can't Stop Loving You"	2014	iTunes Session
Elijah Kelley	"You Can't Win"	2015	The Wiz Live! Original Soundtrack
Elijah Kelley	"Ease On down the Road"	2015	The Wiz Live! Original Soundtrack
Kieran Hebden	"Thriller"	2008	3rd
Kashief Lindo	"I Can't Help It"	1997	What Kinda World
Kashief Lindo	"She's Out of My Life"	1997	What Kinda World
Keiko Lee	"I Can't Help It"	2007	In Essence
Kesang Marstrand	"Say Say Say"	2008	Bodega Rose
Kaare Norge	"Will You Be There"	2003	Kaare Norge| Here Comes the Sun
Khalil Fong	"Bad"	2009	Timeless
Kim Fields	"Dear Michael"	1984	Dear Michael
Kery James	"Lettre à Mon Public" (contains elements of "Give In to Me")	2009	Réel
Leon Ware	"I Wanna Be Where You Are"	2003	Musical Massage
Leningrad Cowboys	"Bad"	2003	Global Balalaika Show
The Long Ryders	"Billie Jean"	1989	Metallic B.O.
Laura Pausini	"Thriller"	2018	Fatti Sentire World Tour
Laura Pausini	"Black or White"	2011	Inedito World Tour
Laura Pausini	"Heal the World"	2009	LP World Tour
Leon Thomas	"Got to Be There"	1973	Full Circle
Leon Thomas	"I Wanna Be Where You Are"	1973	Full Circle
Leehom Wang	"Man in the Mirror"	2009	Man in the Mirror-Single
Laura White	"You Are Not Alone"	2008	The X Factor Finalists
London Symphonic Orchestra	"Billie Jean"	1995	The London Symphonic Orchestra - Plays The Music of Michael Jackson
London Symphonic Orchestra	"The Girl Is Mine"	1995	The London Symphonic Orchestra - Plays The Music of Michael Jackson
London Symphonic Orchestra	"Thriller"	1995	The London Symphonic Orchestra - Plays The Music of Michael Jackson
London Symphonic Orchestra	"I Just Can't Stop Loving You"	1995	The London Symphonic Orchestra - Plays The Music of Michael Jackson
London Symphonic Orchestra	"The Way You Make Me Feel"	1995	The London Symphonic Orchestra - Plays The Music of Michael Jackson
London Symphonic Orchestra	"She's Out of My Life"	1995	The London Symphonic Orchestra - Plays The Music of Michael Jackson
London Symphonic Orchestra	"Beat It"	1995	The London Symphonic Orchestra - Plays The Music of Michael Jackson
London Symphonic Orchestra	"Ben"	1995	The London Symphonic Orchestra - Plays The Music of Michael Jackson
London Symphonic Orchestra	"Leave Me Alone"	1995	The London Symphonic Orchestra - Plays The Music of Michael Jackson
London Symphonic Orchestra	"One Day in Your Life"	1995	The London Symphonic Orchestra - Plays The Music of Michael Jackson
London Symphonic Orchestra	"Man in the Mirror"	1995	The London Symphonic Orchestra - Plays The Music of Michael Jackson
London Symphonic Orchestra	"Bad"	1995	The London Symphonic Orchestra - Plays The Music of Michael Jackson
Mike Post	"Beat It"	1998	It's Post Time
Melody Fall	"Beat It"	2008	Hybrid
Mariachi Divas de Cindy Shea	"Ben"	2010	Viva La Diva!
Mariachi Divas de Cindy Shea	"She's Out of My Life"	2010	Viva La Diva!
Marti Webb	"Ben"	1985	Single
Me First and the Gimme Gimmes	"Ain't No Sunshine"	2003	Take a Break (album)
Me First and the Gimme Gimmes	"I'll Be There"	2003	Take a Break (album)
Me First and the Gimme Gimmes	"Ben"	2003	Single
Melissa Manchester	"I Wanna Be Where You Are"	1977	Singin'...
Mina	"Billie Jean"	1990	Ti Conosco Mascherina
Miles Davis	"Human Nature"	1985	You're Under Arrest
Metallica	"Beat It"	2003, 2009	Live at the 2003 MTV Video Music Awards and Live at the 2009 Sonisphere Festival in Hockenheimring, Germany
Maysa Leak	"I Can't Help It"	2007	Feel the Fire
Michael Bublé	"Man in the Mirror"	2010	Crazy Love Tour
Michael Bublé	"Billie Jean"	2010	Crazy Love Tour
Marvin Gaye	"I Wanna Be Where You Are"	1976	I Want You
Madonna	"Billie Jean"	1985	The Virgin Tour
María Isabel	"You Are Not Alone"	2010	The Choirgirl
Maysa Leak	"The Lady in My Life"	2010	A Woman in Love
Milton Nascimento	"Beat It"	1999	Crooner
Mýa	"The Lady in My Life"	2000	Fear of Flying
Monday Michiru	"I Wanna Be Where You Are"	2000	Soul Source Jackson 5 Remixes
Marsha Ambrosius	"Butterflies"	2011	Late Nights & Early Mornings
MC Lyte	"Keep On, Keepin' On" (contains a sample of "Liberian Girl")	1996	Sunset Park soundtrack
Morgan Heritage	"The Girl Is Mine"	2013	Here Come the Kings
Moscow Symphony Orchestra	"Smooth Criminal"	2010	Smooth Criminal (single)
Miguel	"She's Out of My Life"	2016	58th Annual Grammy Awards
Musical Youth	"She's Trouble"	1983	Different Style!
Nonpoint	"Billie Jean"	2010	(Released as a free download)
Northern Kings	"They Don't Care About Us"	2008	Rethroned
Neil Finn	"Billie Jean"	2001	Andrew Denton's Musical Challenge
Nas	"It Ain't Hard to Tell" (contains a sample of "Human Nature")	1994	Illmatic
Nina Girado	"She's Out of My Life"	2009	Renditions of the Soul
Ninja Sex Party	"Rock with You"	2016	Under the Covers
O'Donel Levy	"I Wanna Be Where You Are"	1973	Dawn Of A New Day
Perri "Pebbles" Reid	"I Can't Help It"	2000	Greatest Hits
Pomplamoose	"Beat It"	2009	Internet Release
Peter White	"Got to Be There"	2003	A Twist Of Motown
City of Prague Philharmonic Orchestra	"Heal the World"	1998	Trumpet Emotions
Phantasmic	"Say Say Say"	1999	I Light Up Your Life
Patti LaBelle	"She's Out of My Life"	2005	Classic Moments
Paul Anka	"The Way You Make Me Feel"	2005	Rock Swings
Peter Andre	"She's Out of My Life"	2010	Unconditional: Love Songs
Percy Faith	"Ben"	1973	Clair
Prince	"Don't Stop 'Til You Get Enough"	2011	Welcome 2 America
Quincy Jones	"Rock with You"	1995	Q's Jook Joint
Quincy Jones	"P.Y.T. (Pretty Young Thing)"	2010	Q Soul Bossa Nostra
Robbie Fulks	"Ben"	2010	Happy
Robbie Fulks	"Billie Jean"	2010	Happy
Robbie Fulks	"Black or White"	2010	Happy
Robbie Fulks	"Don't Stop 'Til You Get Enough"	2010	Happy
Robbie Fulks	"Farewell My Summer Love"	2010	Happy
Robbie Fulks	"Privacy"	2010	Happy
Robbie Fulks	"Man in the Mirror"	2010	Happy
Robbie Fulks	"The Girl Is Mine"	2010	Happy
Robbie Fulks	"The Way You Make Me Feel"	2010	Happy
Ray Stevens	"Bad"	1988	I Never Made a Record I Didn't Like
Richard Cheese	"Beat It"	2004	I'd Like a Virgin
Richard Cheese	"The Girl Is Mine"	2005	Aperitif for Destruction
Richie Stephens	"I Just Can't Stop Loving You"	2009	Jackson Lovers
Raintime	"Beat It"	2007	Flies & Lies
Raffaella Carrà	"Bad"	1988	Raffaella Carrá Show
Raffaella Carrà	"I Just Can't Stop Loving You"	1988	Raffaella Carrá Show
Ruben Studdard	"I Can't Help It"	2009	Love Is
Ramsey Lewis	"Got to Be There"	1972	Upendo Ni Pamoja
Roselle Nava	"Got to Be There"	1994	Roselle
Roi Heenok	"Liberian Girl"	2007	Cocaïno Rap Musique: Volume 1
R. Kelly	"You Are Not Alone"	2010	Love Letter
Saliva	"They Don't Care About Us"	2016	Love, Lies & Therapy
Shaman's Harvest	"Dirty Diana"	2014	Smokin' Hearts & Broken Guns
Supergrass	"Beat It"	2008	Bad Blood
Soulwax	"Billie Jean"	2003	Hang All DJ's Volume 2
The String Cheese Incident	"Don't Stop 'Til You Get Enough"	2002	On the Road
Stanley Jordan	"The Lady in My Life"	1991	Stolen Moments
Stig Rossen	"She's Out of My Life"	1997	Letters of Love
Sybil Lynch	"I Wanna Be Where You Are"	1989	Sybil
Shinehead	"Billie Jean"	1986	Rough & Rugged
Shivaree	"Don't Stop 'Til You Get Enough"	2007	Tainted Love: Mating Calls and Fight Songs
SWV	"Right Here/Human Nature"	1992	It's About Time
SWV	"I Wanna Be Where You Are"	1998	Hav Plenty
Silk	"The Lady in My Life"	2006	Always and Forever
Shirley Bassey	"She's Out of My Life"	1982	All by Myself
Salena Jones	"She's Out of My Life"	2001	Those Eyes
Sugar Minott	"We've Got a Good Thing Going"	1981	Good Thing Going
Singing Melody	"Thriller"	2009	Jackson Lovers
Shakaya	"The Way You Make Me Feel"	2003	The Way You Make Me Feel
Sergey Lazarev	"Earth Song"	2005	Don't Be Fake
Sly and Robbie	"Billie Jean"	2005	Sly And Robbie's Taxi Sound - Marking 30 Years Of Taxi Records
Susan Wong	"Billie Jean"	2009	511 2009
Silvy De Bie	"Ben"	1990	Ben
Sanchez	"Ben"	1988	Loneliness
Sid Owen	"We've Got a Good Thing Going"	2000	Good Thing Going
Siedah Garrett	"Man in the Mirror"	2003	Siedah
Teresa Teng	"Beat It"	1999	十億個掌聲 Taipei Concert 1984
The Civil Wars	"Billie Jean"	2011	Barton Hollow
The Unseen	"Beat It"	1999	So This Is Freedom?
The Impossibles	"Ben"	1999	Anthology
The Lost Fingers	"Billie Jean"	2008	Lost in the 80s
Three Days Grace	"Give In to Me"	2012	Transit of Venus
The Bates	"Billie Jean"	1995	Billie Jean
Tuck Andress	"Man in the Mirror"	1990	Reckless Precision
Texas Lightning	"Man in the Mirror"	2005	Meanwhile, Back at the Ranch
Tarrus Riley	"Human Nature"	2009	Jackson Lovers
Trijntje Oosterhuis	"Baby Be Mine"	2009	Never Can Say Goodbye-Trijntje |Never Can Say Goodbye
Trijntje Oosterhuis	"Music and Me"	2009	Never Can Say Goodbye-Trijntje |Never Can Say Goodbye
Trijntje Oosterhuis	"The Lady in My Life"	2009	Never Can Say Goodbye-Trijntje |Never Can Say Goodbye
Trijntje Oosterhuis	"One Day in Your Life"	2009	Never Can Say Goodbye-Trijntje |Never Can Say Goodbye
Trijntje Oosterhuis	"I Just Can't Stop Loving You"	2009	Never Can Say Goodbye-Trijntje |Never Can Say Goodbye
Trijntje Oosterhuis	"Don't Stop 'Til You Get Enough"	2009	Never Can Say Goodbye-Trijntje |Never Can Say Goodbye
Trijntje Oosterhuis	"Workin' Day and Night"	2009	Never Can Say Goodbye-Trijntje |Never Can Say Goodbye
Trijntje Oosterhuis	"I Can't Help It"	2009	Never Can Say Goodbye-Trijntje |Never Can Say Goodbye
Trijntje Oosterhuis	"Rock with You"	2009	Never Can Say Goodbye-Trijntje |Never Can Say Goodbye
Trijntje Oosterhuis	"Human Nature"	2009	Never Can Say Goodbye-Trijntje |Never Can Say Goodbye
Trijntje Oosterhuis	"Gone Too Soon"	2009	Never Can Say Goodbye-Trijntje |Never Can Say Goodbye
Trijntje Oosterhuis	"You Were There"	2009	Never Can Say Goodbye-Trijntje |Never Can Say Goodbye
The Boys	"Got to Be There"	1990	The Boys
The Miracles	"Got to Be There"	1972	Flying High Together
Terence	"Earth Song"	2002	Earth Song (Remix)
Tony Succar	"I Want You Back"	2015	Unity: The Latin Tribute to Michael Jackson
Tony Succar	"Billie Jean"	2015	Unity: The Latin Tribute to Michael Jackson
Tony Succar	"Man in the Mirror"	2015	Unity: The Latin Tribute to Michael Jackson
Tony Succar	"Sera Que No Me Amas"	2015	Unity: The Latin Tribute to Michael Jackson
Tony Succar	"Earth Song"	2015	Unity: The Latin Tribute to Michael Jackson
Tony Succar	"Human Nature"	2015	Unity: The Latin Tribute to Michael Jackson
Tony Succar	"Todo Mi Amor Eres Tu"	2015	Unity: The Latin Tribute to Michael Jackson
Tony Succar	"Black or White"	2015	Unity: The Latin Tribute to Michael Jackson
Tony Succar	"Smooth Criminal"	2015	Unity: The Latin Tribute to Michael Jackson
Tony Succar	"They Don't Care About Us"	2015	Unity: The Latin Tribute to Michael Jackson
Tony Succar	"Thriller"	2015	Unity: The Latin Tribute to Michael Jackson
Tony Succar	"You Are Not Alone"	2015	Unity: The Latin Tribute to Michael Jackson
Toro Y Moi	"Human Nature"	2009	Chum Onah
Toto	"Human Nature"	2019	40 Trips Around the Sun
Těžkej Pokondr	"Thriller"	1996	Sbohem Tvá Mána
The Lovelites	"Got to Be There"	1990	Rare 5
Thriller – Live	"Earth Song"	2020	
Thriller – Live	"Speechless"	2010	Speechless
Tech N9ne	"The Last Sad Song" (contains a sample of "Give In to Me")	2009	The Lost Scripts of K.O.D.
The LoveCrave	"Thriller"	2010	Digital Download
The Weeknd	"Dirty Diana"	2011	Echoes of Silence
Twice	"I Want You Back"	2018	BDZ
Uwe Schmidt	"Beat It"	2003	Fiesta Songs
Usher	"Rock with You"	2013	Rock and Roll Hall of Fame
Usher	"Gone Too Soon"	2009	Michael Jackson memorial service
Usha Uthup	"Don't Stop 'Til You Get Enough"	1981	Chup Kay Kon Aya Hay
Vijay Iyer	"Human Nature"	2010	Solo
Vijay Iyer Trio	"Human Nature"	2012	Accelerando
Weezer	"Billie Jean"	2019	Weezer (Teal Album)
Will Martin	"I Just Can't Stop Loving You"	2010	INSPIRATIONS
Willie Hutch	"I Wanna Be Where You Are"	1973	Fully Exposed
Willie Nelson	"She's Out of My Life"	1984	City of New Orleans
Wayne Wonder	"Heal the World"	2006	Don't Have To
Xuxa	"Heal the World"	1992	No album
Xerath	"Speed Demon"	2011	Online
"Weird Al" Yankovic	"Eat It" (parody of "Beat It")	1984	"Weird Al" Yankovic in 3-D
"Weird Al" Yankovic	"Fat" (parody of "Bad")	1989	Even Worse
Yngwie Malmsteen	"Beat It"	2009	High Impact
Yuya Matsushita	"Rock with You"	2011	SUPER DRIVE
Zulema	"I Wanna Be Where You Are"	1975	Zulema
Zolof the Rock & Roll Destroyer	"Say Say Say"	2007	Duet All Night Long
ZAYN	"Man in the Mirror"	2012	Up All Night Tour
ZAYN	"You Are Not Alone"	2018	Jammin Season

== See also ==
- Category:Michael Jackson tribute albums
