= Tell Me Why (John Holt song) =

1974 song by John Holt

Single by Musical Youth

from the album Different Style!
- B-side: "Reason"
- Released: 1 July 1983
- Recorded: 1983
- Genre: Reggae; reggae-pop
- Length: 3:14; 6:17 (12" version)
- Label: MCA
- Songwriter(s): John Holt
- Producer(s): Peter Collins

Musical Youth singles chronology
"Heartbreaker" (1983)	"Tell Me Why" (1983)	"Unconditional Love" (1983)

"Tell Me Why" is a song by Jamaican reggae singer John Holt, released as the B-side to his UK top-ten single "Help Me Make It Through the Night" in 1974. It was covered by Musical Youth in 1983, becoming a top-40 hit.

== Musical Youth version ==
=== Releases ===
"Tell Me Why" was released as a single at the beginning of July 1983 with the B-side "Reason", written by Musical Youth's Dennis Seaton and Freddie "Junior" Waite. Whereas the A-side was produced by Peter Collins, "Reason" was produced by Toney Owens. There were two versions of the 12-inch singles released. The first features a remix of "Tell Me Why" by Willi Morrison and Ian Guenther as well as an extended version of "Reason". The second features an additional track, a remix of "Heartbreaker", which had been released as the band's previous single. This 12"-inch single was only released in Europe, where "Heartbreaker" had not been released as a single.

=== Reception ===
Reviewing for Record Mirror, Paul Sexton wrote "It's not bad, of course, it's not bad, but now that we know what they look like, it's all down to the records and this John Holt number, as jiggled about by our short friends, has few distinguishing marks. Pity, because the idea of the group is still fun, but they need something to replace novelty value". Dave Rimmer for Smash Hits described it as "very jolly and jolly accomplished version... I'm glad they've got away from those vague "youth of today" -style clichés, the toasting is excellent and some of the percussion noises (the work of producer Peter Collins?) are particularly good fun".

=== Track listings ===
7": MCA / YOU 5

1. "Tell Me Why" – 3:14
2. "Reason" – 3:28

12": MCA / YOUT 5

1. "Tell Me Why" (Special US Remix) – 6:17
2. "Reason" (Extended Version) – 6:50

12": MCA / 600 962-213

1. "Tell Me Why" (Special US Remix) – 6:17
2. "Reason" (Extended Version) – 6:50
3. "Heartbreaker" (Special Dance Mix) – 5:36

=== Charts ===
Chart (1983)	Peak position
Belgium (Ultratop 50 Flanders)	35
Ireland (IRMA)	20
Netherlands (Dutch Top 40)	26
Netherlands (Single Top 100)	31
UK Singles (OCC)	33
