= Dublin City Soul Festival =

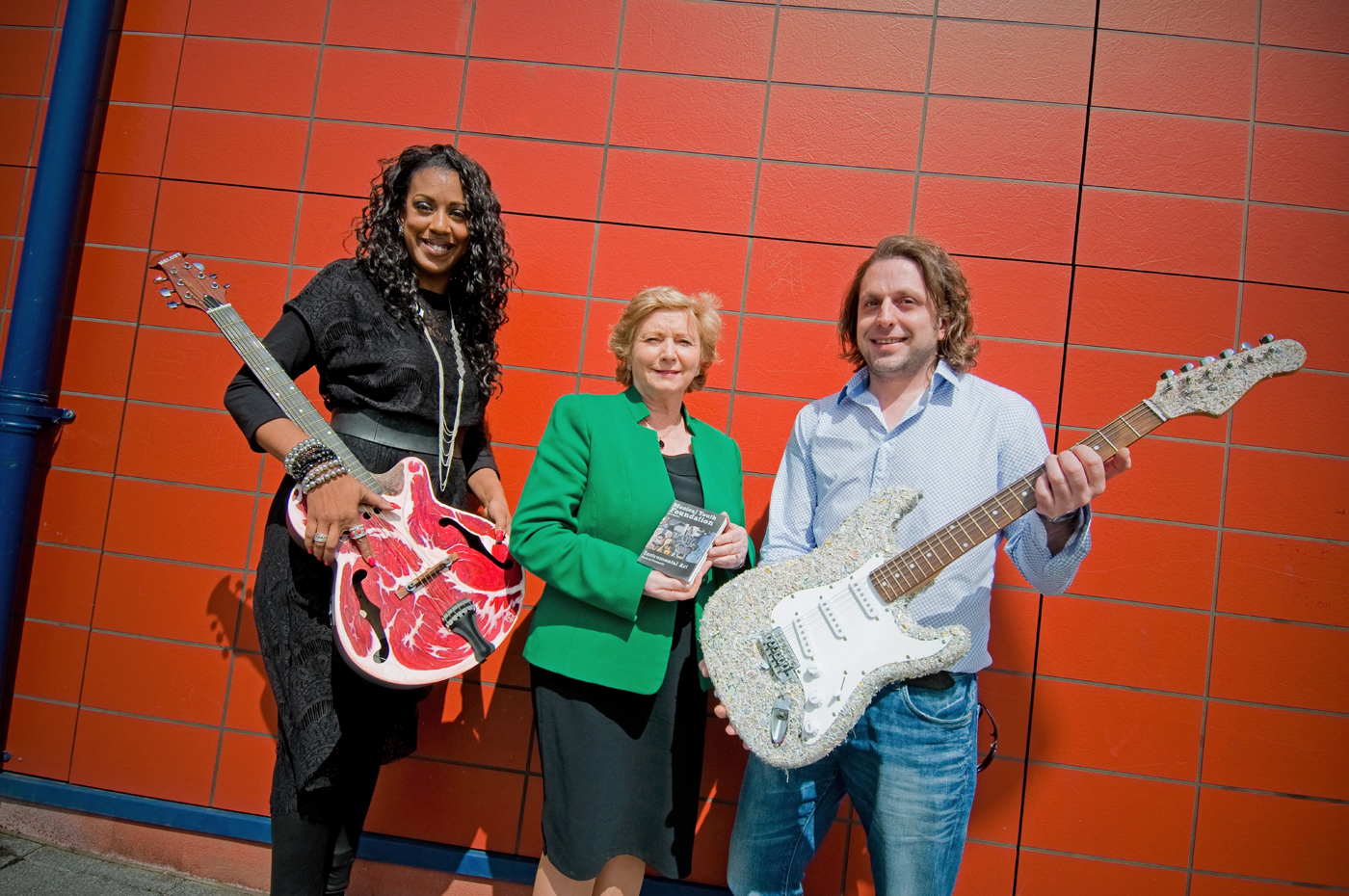
- (From Left to Right): Carmen Browne, Frances Fitzgerald, and Chris Maher at the 2013 Dublin City Soul Festival 2013
- Status: Active
- Genre: Festivals
- Frequency: Annually
- Locations: Dublin, Ireland
- Inaugurated: 2007
- Founder: Chris Maher, Paul Slattery, Redmond O Hanlon
- Attendance: 20,000
- Major events: Soul music

The Dublin City Soul Festival is an annual soul music festival held each spring in Dublin, Ireland. The festival was founded in 2007 by Chris Maher with Paul Slattery and Redmond O Hanlon. The festival motto is “a celebration of peace, unity and love”. The festival takes place all around Dublin City Centre. Since 2007 the locations that have hosted the Dublin City Soul Festival include The Grand Social, Merrion Square park and Meeting House Square.

In 2007 the Dublin City Soul Festival won the Irish Times Living Dublin Award for Culture and Tourism. The festival attracts tourists to visit Dublin city. More than 20,000 people attended the events in 2011.

The Dublin City Soul Festival gives a Soul Award each year to a member of the public who does soulful work in the community. In 2009 the award was presented to Joan Freeman, for founding the Pieta and for having outstanding Dublin Soul. The festival provides financial support to the Musical Youth Foundation, a charity that provides every child on the island of Ireland with a musical education. Most of the events at the Dublin City Soul Festival are free; the events that are ticketed raise money for this Foundation.

The festival hosts many events under the Dublin City Soul Festival name. One of the events is the “Soul Picnic”, which takes place on the last weekend in May each year in Merrion Square Park. The music played at this event consists of all music genres with a soulful feeling. The festival’s line up in the past has included Mirenda Rosenberg, Tony Allen and many other recognised national and international artists.

Another festival event is “Rising Stars”. This is a competition that was launched in 2009 and searches each year for global best emerging artists. In 2011 Wyvern Lingo won the competition and won a spot at the soul picnic. Another winner of the rising stars competition was Mob Fandango whom also went on to play at the Soul Picnic.

Among the 2011 Festival events were Eye Candy, Laugh Your Soul Off and the Grape Vine. In 2014 there will also be a Soul Jam, Gospel Brunches and a City Music Trail.

The festival has partnered with Pump Audio, Dublin Tourism, Dublin people, Eircom and Balcony SponTV.
