= Different Style! =

Studio album by Musical Youth
- Released: October 1983
- Recorded: 1983
- Studio: Lion Share, Los Angeles; Cherokee, Los Angeles
- Genre: Reggae, R&B, pop rock
- Label: MCA
- Producer: Peter Collins

Musical Youth chronology
The Youth of Today (1982)	Different Style! (1983)	Anthology (1994)

Singles from Different Style!
- 1. "Tell Me Why" Released: 1 July 1983; 2. "007" Released: 14 October 1983; 3. "She's Trouble" Released: November 1983; 4. "Sixteen" Released: 6 January 1984; 5. "Whatcha Talking 'Bout" Released: April 1984

Different Style! is the second album by the British Jamaican reggae band Musical Youth, released in 1983.

== Background ==
Professional ratings
Review scores
Source	Rating
AllMusic	4.5/5 stars
Reggae Reviews	unfavorable
The Rolling Stone Album Guide	1.5/5 stars

The album was released one year after the massive success of "Pass the Dutchie" and the first album. As The Youth of Today, Different Style! contains ten reggae tracks, however, this time more R&B-influenced, to make it more accessible on the North American market. Unlike the debut release, which was written strictly by Freddie Waite and the band members themselves, Different Style! saw more different musicians contributing to lyrics and music, including major stars Stevie Wonder and Boy George. Tracks sequence varied depending on territory, as did the album cover.

Five singles have been released off the album. "Tell Me Why" appeared long before the album's release and met with modest success. Two following singles, "007" and "Sixteen", charted only in the United Kingdom and Ireland, making it to the top 30 and top 25. At the same time, North American market opted for "She's Trouble" (originally written for Michael Jackson for his monster-selling Thriller album. It was offered to Musical Youth by David "Hawk" Wolinski and later recorded by Michael Lovesmith) which became the second single, after "Pass the Dutchie", to enter charts in the USA and Canada. In the UK, the song was their lowest-charting single and it happened to be also the very last chart entry for Musical Youth. "Whatcha Talking 'Bout" flopped completely in the charts.

Different Style! turned out a commercial flop and was overshadowed by the success of the debut album. It failed to enter UK Albums Chart, and only charted in Canada and the United States, peaking at disappointing positions 90 and 144 respectively.

== Track listing ==
=== Original release ===
Side A

1. "007" (Desmond Dacres) - 3:18
2. "Yard Stylee" (Musical Youth) - 3:39
3. "Air Taxi" (Musical Youth) - 3:51
4. "Sixteen" (Freddie Waite, Lamont Dozier) - 3:51
5. "Incommunicado" (Bruce Sudano, Carlotta McKee, Gordon Grote) - 3:23

Side B

1. "Tell Me Why" (John Holt) - 3:13
2. "She's Trouble" (Billy Livsey, Terry Britten, Sue Shifrin) - 3:09
3. "Mash It the Youth Man, Mash It" (Musical Youth) - 4:22
4. "Whatcha Talking 'Bout" (Stevie Wonder) - 5:06
5. "No Strings" (Boy, Phil Picket) - 3:00

=== Alternative track listing ===
Side A

1. "007" (Desmond Dacres) - 3:18
2. "She's Trouble" (Billy Livsey, Terry Britten, Sue Shifrin) - 3:09
3. "Whatcha Talking 'Bout" (Stevie Wonder) - 5:06
4. "Incommunicado" (Bruce Sudano, Carlotta McKee, Gordon Grote) - 3:23
5. "No Strings" (Boy, Phil Picket) - 3:00

Side B

1. "Tell Me Why" (John Holt) - 3:13
2. "Sixteen" (Freddie Waite, Lamont Dozier) - 3:51
3. "Yard Stylee" (Musical Youth) - 3:39
4. "Air Taxi" (Musical Youth) - 3:51
5. "Mash It the Youth Man, Mash It" (Musical Youth) - 4:22

== Personnel ==
Musical Youth

- Dennis Seaton - vocals, percussion
- Freddie "Junior" Waite - drums, vocals
- Kelvin Grant - guitars, vocals
- Michael Grant - keyboards, vocals
- Patrick Waite - bass

with:

- Donna Summer - uncredited vocals on "Sixteen"
- Jody Watley - uncredited vocals on "Incommunicado"

Technical

- John "Aruba" Arrias - engineer
- Pete Hammond - engineer on "Tell Me Why"
- Julian Mendelsohn - remixing
- Jerry Hey - horn arrangements
- Richard Myhill - horn arrangement on "Tell Me Why"
- Gavin Cochrane - photography

"Thanks to Bruce Sudano, Donna Summer, Jackie Castellano, Jackie Mittoo, Jody Watley, Lamont Dozier, Melvin "Wah Wah" Watson, Stevie Wonder, The Jacksons"

== Chart performance ==
Chart	Peak position
Canada	90
United States	144
United States (Top R&B/Black Albums)	50
