= Never Gonna Give You Up (disambiguation) =

"Never Gonna Give You Up" is a song recorded in 1986 and released in 1987 by Rick Astley.

Never Gonna Give You Up can also refer to:

- "Never Gonna Give You Up" (Mai Kuraki song), 2000
- "Never Gonna Give You Up" (Musical Youth song), 1983
- "Never Gonna Give You Up", a song by Isaac Hayes on his 1971 album Black Moses
- "Never Gonna Give You Up (Won't Let You Be)", a 1981 song by Patrice Rushen
- "Never Gonna Give You Up", a song by Stephanie Mills on her 1992 album Something Real
- "Never Gonna Give You Up" (Degrassi: The Next Generation), a third-season episode of the TV series Degrassi: The Next Generation

== See also ==
- "Never, Never Gonna Give Ya Up", a song performed by Barry White, released in 1973
- "Never Give You Up", a 1968 song by soul singer Jerry Butler, covered by many others
- "Never Give You Up", a 1982 song by Sharon Redd
- "Never Give You Up", a Grammy-nominated song by Raphael Saadiq on his 2008 album The Way I See It
- "Ain't Never Gonna Give You Up", a song recorded in 1996 by Paula Abdul
- Rickroll
