= Dennis Seaton =

English singer (born 1967)

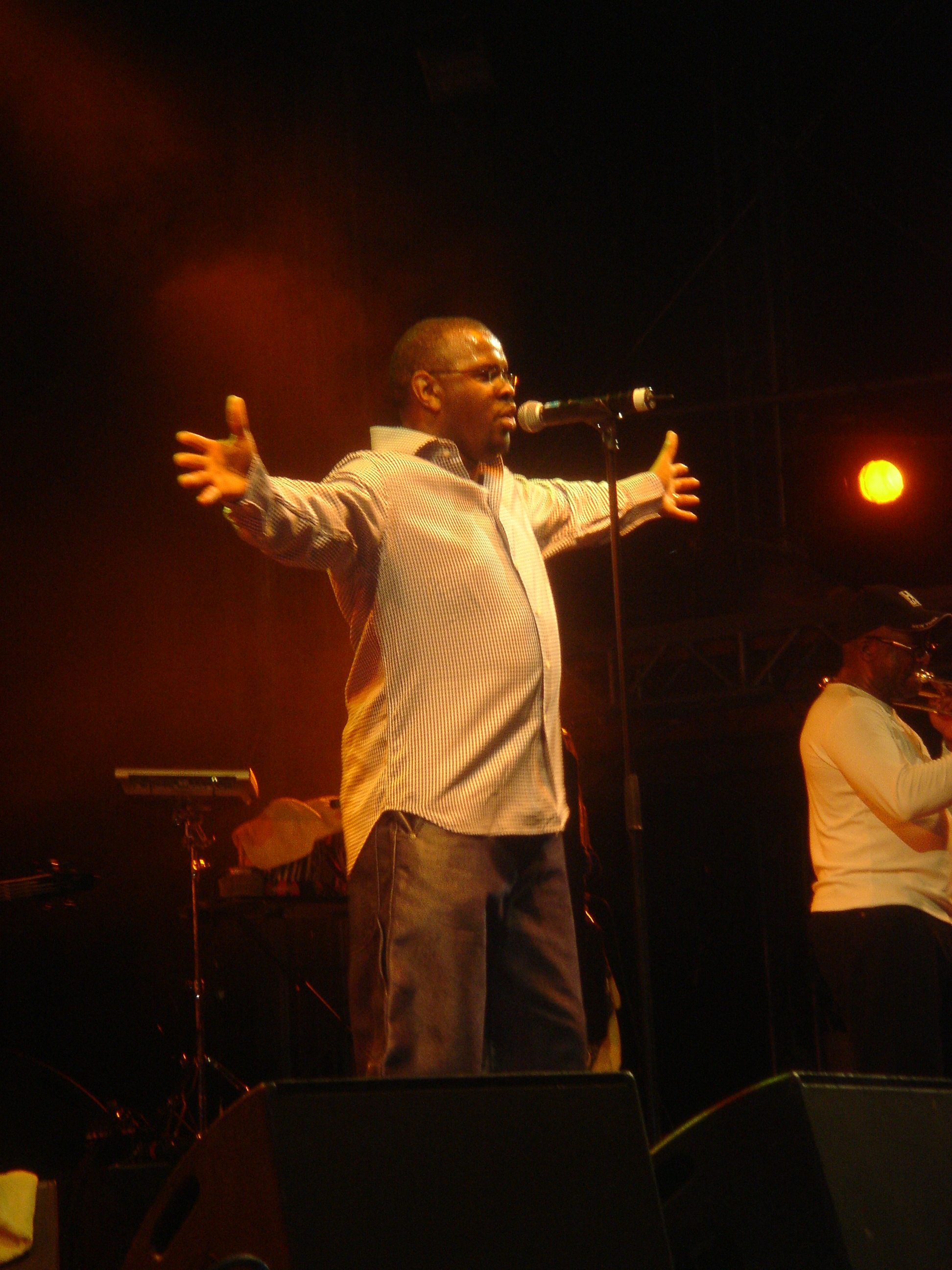
- Seaton performing in Austria in 2005

Background information
- Also known as: Musical Youth; Musical Man
- Born: Dennis Michael Seaton; 2 March 1967 (age 59); Birmingham, England
- Origin: London, England
- Genres: Reggae; soul; R&B
- Occupations: Singer; songwriter; musician
- Instrument: Vocals
- Years active: 1979–present
- Labels: 021; MCA

Dennis Michael Seaton (born 2 March 1967) is a British soul and R&B singer, songwriter, and record producer, best known as the frontman of the British reggae band Musical Youth.

== Biography ==
Seaton first found fame as a member of Musical Youth. Friends Kelvin Grant, his older brother Michael Grant, Patrick Waite, and his younger brother Freddie Waite formed the group in 1979 while at Duddeston Manor School with Patrick and Freddie's father Frederick, a former member of the Techniques. They played gigs at local talent shows and across the United Kingdom.

Waite senior was soon replaced by Seaton and the group performed on John Peel's BBC Radio 1 show, where they performed two of their own songs: "Political" and "Generals". MCA Records signed them in late 1981.

In the middle of 1982, 15-year-old Seaton and the group released the hit single "Pass the Dutchie" (a pun on the Mighty Diamonds song "Pass the Kouchie"), but in this case, the song talked about poor Jamaican people using it as a cooking pot. The single was highly successful, topping the UK Singles Chart and peaking at number ten on the Billboard Hot 100. The band were the first black artists to be played on MTV. They followed this up with the debut album, The Youth of Today, released worldwide on 22 October 1982. In 1984, Seaton was nominated for the Best newcomer Grammy Award with his band Musical Youth, but lost to Culture Club.

On 9 September 1983, the group released their second and final album, Different Style, with only two singles: "Tell Me Why" and "007"; both songs flopped on the Billboard charts. Seaton announced that he was leaving the group and they split up in June 1985, with Seaton going on to form his own short-lived group, XMY. Seaton also converted to Christianity.

In 1989, Seaton released a solo album, Imagine That, on the Bellaphon label, with songwriting assistance from Stevie Wonder. His solo career did not take off and he worked as a delivery driver and then in the car rental industry for twelve years, eventually co-owning his own company. He also returned to studying, earning a music degree.

In late 1993, eight years after Seaton left Musical Youth, he rejoined, but on 18 February 1993, his bandmate Patrick Waite died of natural causes, leaving the group with four members. Another eight years later, in 2001, Musical Youth reformed and came back into the spotlight now as a quintet. Seaton and Michael Grant still perform as "Musical Youth".

In 2009, he appeared on The Justin Lee Collins Show, as a blast from the past.

On 28 June 2009, he appeared on Sunday Live with Adam Boulton on Sky News talking about the life, death and legacy of Michael Jackson.

He now works as a trainer for HSS Hire.
