= Pass the Kouchie =

Song by the Mighty Diamonds

Single by the Mighty Diamonds
- Released: 1981
- Genre: Reggae

"Pass the Kouchie" is a 1981 Jamaican reggae song by the Mighty Diamonds. The song is based around Rastafarian use of cannabis via cannabis pipes. It was later adapted by the British-Jamaican group Musical Youth as "Pass the Dutchie".

== History ==
"Pass the Kouchie" was based upon a 1968 reggae instrumental piece called "Full Up" by Leroy Sibbles. When the song was released, it was condemned by the Prime Minister of Jamaica Edward Seaga for endorsing the use of illegal cannabis. The government of Jamaica subsequently banned it from being played on national radio as part of a drive against "kouchie culture". Despite this, the song was popular and became a top seller in Jamaican music shops and held that position for several weeks. The song was viewed as having established the Mighty Diamonds as being highly regarded in the reggae music scene. It also gained popularity internationally.

== Adaptation ==
"Pass the Kouchie" gained popularity within the Caribbean communities in the United Kingdom and the United States. In 1982, the British group Musical Youth adapted "Pass the Kouchie" for release in the United Kingdom. In the adaption, they changed the word "kouchie" to "dutchie" (a cooking pot) and other lyrics referencing drugs being changed to food. The majority of the United Kingdom at large were not aware of it being based on "Pass the Kouchie" and the cannabis background of it. Despite the change being made to specifically avoid drug references, "dutchie" later eventually became a slang word for cannabis because of the song. The adaption reached number one in the UK Singles Charts. In 2012, the relationship was subject to an English High Court case regarding copyright royalties where it was held that "Pass the Dutchie" shared the same copyright as "Pass the Kouchie".
