= She's Trouble =

1983 single by Musical Youth, originally recorded by Michael Jackson

Song by Michael Jackson

from the album Thriller 40
- Released: November 18, 2022
- Genre: Post-disco; funk; dance-pop
- Length: 4:13
- Label: Epic
- Songwriters: Billy Livsey; Terry Britten; Sue Shifrin
- Producer: Quincy Jones

"She's Trouble", also known as "Trouble", is a song by Michael Jackson, originally written and recorded for inclusion on his sixth studio album, Thriller (1982). Jackson's original version was an outtake and therefore not released, either as a single or an album cut. Two versions of Jackson's demo leaked online, a rough vocal version and a final version in low quality. On November 18, 2022, Jackson's version was released on Thriller 40.

== Musical Youth version ==
"She's Trouble"

Single by Musical Youth

from the album Different Style!
- B-side: "Yard Stylee" (US); "Tell Jack" (UK)
- Released: November 1983 (US)
- Genre: Reggae; pop rock
- Length: 3:06
- Label: MCA
- Songwriters: Billy Livsey; Terry Britten; Sue Shifrin
- Producer: Peter Collins

Musical Youth singles chronology
| "Sixteen" (1983) | "She's Trouble" (1983) | "Whatcha Talking 'Bout" (1984) |

Music video
- "She's Trouble" on YouTube

In 1983, the song was recorded by British reggae band Musical Youth. Musical Youth's rendition of the song was released as a single in November, reaching number 65 on the US Billboard Hot 100, their second and last single to chart, after "Pass the Dutchie", which reached number 10 in early 1983, and number 56 on Cash Box in early 1984. It also charted in Canada, peaking at number 43. On the US R&B chart, "She's Trouble" reached number 25.

In the UK, where "She's Trouble" wasn't released until May 1984, it charted very minorly. It was the third of five singles released from their album Different Style! in the UK, the first four of which charted. It was the only charting single from the album in North America.

=== Reception ===
Reviewing for Record Mirror, Jennet Dainty described "She's Trouble" as a "polished, well produced piece from the kids, who don't sound at all youth-ish on this single. Danceable, sing-along-able stuff that's a sure indication that the band have moved out of the nursery and are no longer going to irritate the punters with their high pitched squeaking". For Number One, Maureen Rice wrote that "Musical Youth were in sore need of something more than youth, novelty and enthusiasm if they were to sustain their appeal. Here it is. More disco than dub and more polish than spit, this is very smooth and very danceable".

=== Track listings ===
7": MCA / MCA-52312 (US)

1. "She's Trouble" – 3:06
2. "Yard Stylee" – 3:39

7": MCA / YOU 8 (UK)

1. "She's Trouble" (Special New Mix) – 3:15
2. "Tell Jack" – 3:20

12": MCA / MCA-13986 (US)

1. "She's Trouble" (Extended Version) – 4:28
2. "She's Trouble" – 3:06
3. "Sixteen" – 3:49

12": MCA / YOUT 8 (UK)

1. "She's Trouble" (Special Extended Mix) – 7:45
2. "Tell Jack" (Extended Mix) – 5:45

=== Charts ===
Chart performance for "She's Trouble"
| Chart (1984) | Peak position |
|---|---|
| Canada Top Singles (RPM) | 43 |
| UK Singles (Official Charts) | 87 |
| US Billboard Hot 100 | 65 |
| US Hot R&B/Hip-Hop Songs (Billboard) | 25 |
| US Cash Box Top 100 | 56 |

== Other cover versions ==
The song was also covered by Scott Baio, released on his second album The Boys Are Out Tonight in May/June 1983 and by Michael Lovesmith on his debut album I Can Make It Happen released in June 1983.
