= Thriller 40 =

2022 studio album (reissue) by Michael Jackson

Studio album (reissue) by Michael Jackson
- Released: November 18, 2022
- Recorded: 1979–1982, 2008 (remixes, overdubs)
- Studio: Westlake (Los Angeles)
- Genres: Pop; post-disco; R&B; rock; funk
- Length: 42:16 (disc 1); 42:53 (disc 2)
- Labels: Epic; Legacy; MJJ
- Producers: Quincy Jones; Michael Jackson

Michael Jackson chronology
Scream (2017)	Thriller 40 (2022)	Michael: Songs from the Motion Picture (2026)

Thriller 40 is the 40th-anniversary edition reissue of Thriller (1982), the sixth album by the American singer Michael Jackson. It was released on November 18, 2022, by Epic, Legacy Recordings, and MJJ Productions. Thriller 40 is the third reissue of Thriller, following the 2001 special edition and Thriller 25 (2008).

== Background ==
Jackson released his sixth studio album, Thriller, on November 30, 1982. With sales estimated to be over 70 million copies worldwide, (Note: Representatives for Sony and Jackson's estate say that Thriller has sold 105 million copies globally. Although sales estimates for Thriller have been as high as 110 million copies, these sales figures are unreliable according to various music specialists.) Thriller became the world's best-selling album of all time; the album was the first in history to yield seven top-ten singles. The success of Thriller put Jackson into the dominating position of pop music, becoming an international pop-cultural icon.

== Marketing and promotion ==
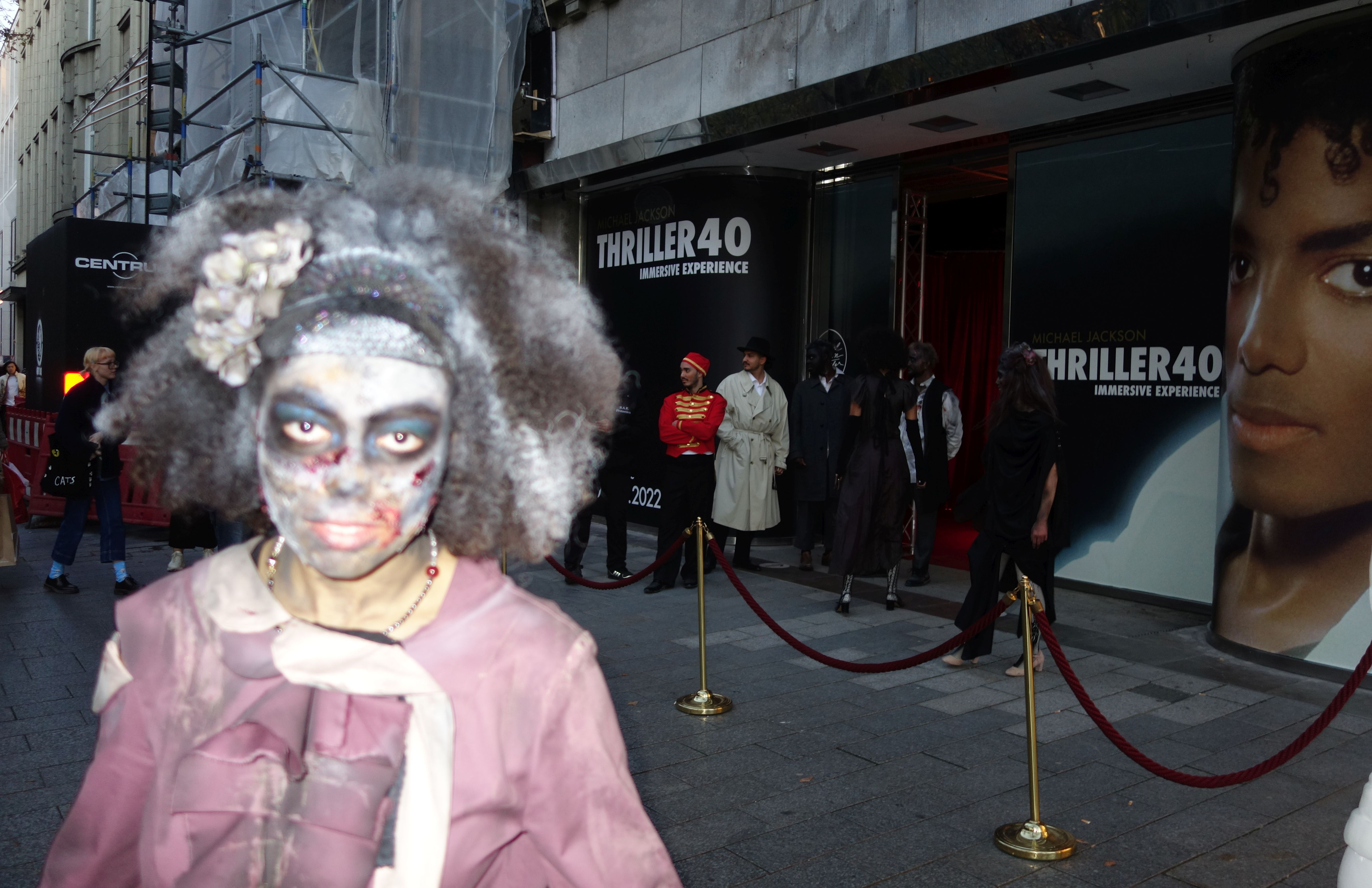
Promotion in Düsseldorf, Germany

The American singer Maxwell performed "The Lady in My Life" at the 2022 Billboard Music Awards. He said, "I'm feeling honored to be here, honored to be able to celebrate the 40th anniversary of Thriller. I've been up since six in the morning trying to get everything together and, you know, just want to do right — it's Michael Jackson. There's nobody better, nobody greater, so I just want to do it well."

Several other activities were planned before the release of Thriller 40. On October 4, music journalist and filmmaker Nelson George announced he was directing a documentary on the making of Thriller, which will include never-before-seen footage.

On November 1, the Michael Jackson Estate and Sony Music launched a worldwide campaign to celebrate the 40th anniversary of the album Thriller, featuring Fan Event Parties, Immersive Experience to be held in two countries: Düsseldorf, Germany on November 10–13 and New York on November 18–20 and there will be an event filming that will be part of Thriller 40 documentary on November 30.

On November 14, Sony Music released the 4K version of Jackson's "Beat It" music video on YouTube. A 4K remaster of the "Thriller" short film also appeared on iTunes and Tidal, though it was removed shortly after. On November 17, the 4K remastered "Thriller" short film was released on YouTube.

== Bonus material ==
Thriller 40 features ten additional tracks on its second disc, including:

- the original demo for Jackson's song "Behind the Mask", previously reworked for the 2010 posthumous album Michael.
- the original demo for "Thriller" ("Starlight"), previously mentioned in the 2001 special edition of Thriller.
- a demo of "Best of Joy" titled "The Toy", first reworked and released on Michael, and originally intended for the 1982 Richard Pryor film of the same name.
- "Got the Hots", first released as a bonus track on the Japanese edition of Thriller 25 and several editions of King of Pop.
- the full version of "Carousel", whereas a shorter version was included on the 2001 special edition.
- "Can't Get Outta the Rain", released as the B-side to "The Girl Is Mine" in 1982 and in 2008 as part of the 3-CD edition of The Essential Michael Jackson.
- "Sunset Driver", released in 2004 on The Ultimate Collection.
- "She's Trouble", leaked in 2009 after Jackson's death.
- "What a Lovely Way to Go" and "Who Do You Know", both of which had never been released before.

== Release ==
Announced on May 16, 2022, by the estate of Michael Jackson, Thriller 40 is the twelfth release by Sony and/or Motown since the death of Jackson in 2009. This edition was mastered for loudness by Brian Gardner.

The company also announced additional releases of the original album by audiophile reissue label Mobile Fidelity Sound Lab on both stereo Super Audio CD and LP, limited to 40,000 numbered copies. The latter portion of the announcement was later credited by The Washington Post journalist Geoff Edgers with fueling public skepticism towards Mobile Fidelity that culminated in a subsequent controversy over them using Direct Stream Digital files in vinyl releases that were marketed as coming directly from analog master tapes. The company also surprise released 360 Reality Audio and Dolby Atmos versions of the original album on Amazon Music and Apple Music respectively on the same day as Thriller 40.

== Documentary film ==
A 90-minute documentary film titled Thriller 40 directed by Nelson George celebrating the 40th anniversary of Thriller was released in the United States on December 2, 2023, airing on Showtime and later appeared on Paramount+ only for Showtime subscribers. Internationally it debuted the same day in the United Kingdom, Australia, Canada, Italy, France, Germany, Switzerland, Austria, Latin America and South Korea. On October 27, 2023, the Michael Jackson estate released a trailer for the Thriller 40 documentary film.

== Commercial performance ==
In the United States, as per Billboard's rule, Thriller 40 is regarded as the same album as Thriller and re-entered the Billboard 200 albums chart at number seven. The album sold a combined total of about 37,000 copies in the first week in the US. The album charted at number 16 in its second week of the release, selling 18,000 (down 35%).

== Track listing ==
All tracks written by Michael Jackson, except where noted. All tracks produced by Quincy Jones, except where noted.

Disc 1: Thriller
No.	Title	Writer(s)	Producer(s)	Length
1.	"Wanna Be Startin' Somethin'"		Jones; Jackson^{[a]}	6:02
2.	"Baby Be Mine"	Rod Temperton		4:20
3.	"The Girl Is Mine" (with Paul McCartney)		Jones; Jackson^{[a]}	3:42
4.	"Thriller"	Temperton		5:57
5.	"Beat It"		Jones; Jackson^{[a]}	4:18
6.	"Billie Jean"		Jones; Jackson^{[a]}	4:54
7.	"Human Nature"	Steve Porcaro; John Bettis		4:06
8.	"P.Y.T. (Pretty Young Thing)"	James Ingram; Jones		3:59
9.	"The Lady in My Life"	Temperton		4:59
Total length:				42:16

Disc 2: Bonus material
No.	Title	Writer(s)	Producer(s)	Length
1.	"Starlight"	Temperton		5:04
2.	"Got the Hots" (Demo)	Temperton		4:25
3.	"Who Do You Know" (Demo)		Jackson	5:23
4.	"Carousel" (Full Version)	Michael Sembello; Don Freeman		3:39
5.	"Behind the Mask" (Mike's Mix, Demo)	Jackson; Ryuichi Sakamoto; Chris Mosdell	Jackson	5:01
6.	"Can't Get Outta the Rain"	Jackson; Jones	Jackson; Jones	4:06
7.	"The Toy" (Demo)		Jackson	3:04
8.	"Sunset Driver" (Demo)		Jackson	4:03
9.	"What a Lovely Way to Go" (Demo)		Jackson	3:55
10.	"She's Trouble" (Demo)	Billy Livsey; Terry Britten; Sue Shifrin		4:13
Total length:				42:53

Deluxe edition bonus tracks (digital only)
No.	Title	Writer(s)	Producer(s)	Length
20.	"Billie Jean" (Home Demo from 1981)		Jackson	2:20
21.	"Billie Jean" (Long Version)		Jones; Jackson^{[a]}	6:20
22.	"Billie Jean 2008" (Kanye West Mix)		Jackson; West; Anthony Kilhoffer	4:35
23.	"Beat It" (Demo)		Jackson	2:03
24.	"Beat It 2008" (with Fergie)		Jackson; will.i.am	4:11
25.	"Wanna Be Startin' Somethin'" (Demo)		Jackson	5:43
26.	"Wanna Be Startin' Somethin'" (Tommy D's Main Mix)		Jackson; Jones; Tommy D	7:40
27.	"Wanna Be Startin' Somethin' 2008" (with Akon)	Jackson; Aliaune Thiam; Giorgio Tuinfort	Jackson; Akon; Tuinfort	4:14
28.	"Human Nature" (7" Remix)	Porcaro; Bettis		3:45
29.	"P.Y.T. (Pretty Young Thing)" (Demo Version)	Jackson; Greg Phillinganes	Jackson	3:46
30.	"P.Y.T. (Pretty Young Thing) 2008" (with will.i.am)	Jackson; William Adams; Keith Harris	Jackson; will.i.am	4:21
31.	"The Girl Is Mine 2008" (with will.i.am)	Jackson; Adams; Harris	Jackson; will.i.am	3:10
32.	"Thriller" (7" Special Edit)	Temperton		4:37
33.	"Thriller" (Def Thriller Mix)	Temperton	Jones; David Morales; Frankie Knuckles	7:22
34.	"Thriller Megamix"	Jackson; Temperton; Jones; Ingram	Jackson; Jones; Jason Nevins	9:14
Total length:				73:21

Total duration: 158:30

Notes

- ^{^[a]} signifies a co-producer

== Charts ==
=== Weekly charts ===
Weekly chart performance for Thriller 40
Chart (2022–2026)	Peak position
Italian Albums (FIMI)	7
Japanese Albums (Oricon)	6
New Zealand Albums (RMNZ)	22
Portuguese Albums (AFP)	5
Swedish Albums (Sverigetopplistan)	38

=== Year-end charts ===
Year-end chart performance for Thriller 40
Chart	Year	Position
Swedish Albums (Sverigetopplistan)	2024	97
Swedish Albums (Sverigetopplistan)	2025	71

== Certifications ==
Region	Certification	Certified units/sales
Spain (Promusicae)	Platinum	40,000^{‡}
Sweden (GLF)	4× Platinum	120,000^{‡}
^{‡} Sales+streaming figures based on certification alone.

== Release history ==
List of release dates, showing country or region, record label, and format
Region	Date	Label	Format
Various	November 18, 2022	Epic; Legacy; MJJ	CD; LP; digital download
