= 007 (Shanty Town) =

Single by Desmond Dekker and The Aces

Single by Desmond Dekker and the Aces

from the album 007 (Shanty Town)
- A-side: "007 (Shanty Town)"
- B-side: "El Torro" (Roland Alphonso)
- Released: 1967
- Genre: Rocksteady
- Label: Pyramid
- Songwriter(s): Desmond Dekker
- Producer(s): Leslie Kong

Desmond Dekker and the Aces singles chronology
"Wise Man" (1967)	"007 (Shanty Town)" (1967)	"It's a Shame" (1967)

Audio sample
- file; help

"007 (Shanty Town)" is a 1967 rocksteady song by Jamaican band Desmond Dekker and the Aces, released as a single from their debut album of the same name. It was also a hit for Musical Youth in 1983. "007 (Shanty Town)" has been called "the most enduring and archetypal" rude boy song. Its title and lyrics refer to the cool imagery of films such as the James Bond series and Ocean's 11, admired by "rudies".

== Desmond Dekker version ==
The original recording of "007" (without the 'Shanty Town') was produced by Leslie Kong and originally released as a single on the Pyramid label. The single featured Roland Alphonso's "El Torro" on the B-side.

Dekker wrote the song after watching news coverage of a student demonstration against government plans to build an industrial complex on land close to the beach, which descended into violence. In Dekker's words:

"The students had a demonstration and it went all the way around to Four Shore Road and down to Shanty Town. You got wildlife and thing like that because it down near the beach. And the higher ones wanted to bulldoze the whole thing down and do their own thing and the students said no way. And it just get out of control...Is just a typical riot 'cause I say - Them a loot, them a shoot, them a wail."

The song also deals with a 'rude boy' who after being released from prison continues to commit crime. Despite its cautionary sentiment, it cemented Dekker's popularity among rude boys in Jamaica, in contrast to Dekker's earlier music, which espoused traditional morals such as parental respect and the importance of education.

"007" was Dekker's first international hit. The single was a number one hit in Jamaica and reached number 14 on the UK Singles Chart, making it the first Jamaican-produced record to reach the UK top 20. Ethnomusicologist Michael Veal identifies "007 (Shanty Town)" as one of the songs that demonstrated the viability of Jamaican music in England.

Dekker recorded the song again for his 1980 album Black and Dekker.

== Cover versions ==
Notable groups who have covered "007 (Shanty Town)" include:

- The Bodysnatchers, for the soundtrack to the 1981 documentary Dance Craze
- Musical Youth, on their 1983 album Different Style!; this version reached 26 on the UK Singles Chart
- The Specials, on their 1996 album Today's Specials

== Other uses ==
The song has been sampled by Special Ed ("I'm the Magnificent") and Shaggy ("Bonafide Girl"). The rhythm had been featured by Anthony B in 2008 on The Pow Pow Trilogy, ("Time For The Love"). UK ska-punk band Sonic Boom Six used a sample of the chorus as the outro to "Rum Little Skallywag".

"007 (Shanty Town)" was included in the soundtrack of the film The Harder They Come, and in the Grand Theft Auto IV soundtrack from the Episodes from Liberty City add-on.

The "007" riddim was revived in 2007 for a series of releases on Beverley's Records, forming the basis of singles from Joseph Cotton ("Ship Sail"), Mike Brooks ("Blam Blam Blam"), The Blackstones ("Out a Road"), and Dennis Alcapone ("D.J. Roll Call").

"007 (Shanty Town)" was included in the soundtrack for Chocolate Skateboard's Las Nueve Vidas De Paco (1995), during the segment of professional skater Keenan Milton. Most recently, it featured on the soundtrack of the 2019 film Vivarium.
