= Songs and Stories =

Studio album by George Benson
- Released: August 25, 2009
- Studios: Henson Recording Studios (Hollywood); Capitol Studios (Hollywood); The Village Recorder (Los Angeles); ATS (Los Angeles); Fox Force Five (Los Angeles); Hannibal Studios (Santa Monica, California); G Studio Digital (Studio City, California); Porcupine Studios (Chandler, Arizona); Mega (Sao Paulo, Brazil)
- Genre: Jazz
- Length: 62:02
- Label: Concord
- Producers: John Burk; Marcus Miller

George Benson chronology
Givin' It Up (2006)	Songs and Stories (2009)	Guitar Man (2011)

Singles from Songs and Stories
- 1. "Family Reunion" Released: 2009; 2. "Living in High Definition" Released: 2009; 3. "Show Me the Love" Released: 2010

Professional ratings
Review scores
Source	Rating
Allmusic	3/5 stars

Songs and Stories is a studio album by George Benson. The album was released by Concord on August 25, 2009. The album was produced by John Burk and Marcus Miller and featured a host of guest musicians.

== Track listing ==
No.	Title	Writer(s)	Length
1.	"Don't Let Me Be Lonely Tonight"	James Taylor	3:48
2.	"Family Reunion"	Catero Colbert, Rod Temperton	4:18
3.	"Show Me the Love"	Steve Lukather, Marcus Miller, David Paich	4:16
4.	"A Telephone Call Away"	Bill Withers	5:54
5.	"Someday We'll All Be Free"	Donny Hathaway, Edward Howard	6:19
6.	"Nuthin' But a Party"	Robert Harris, Christopher Lomax, Marlon McClain, Larry Troutman, Roger Troutman	5:28
7.	"Come in from the Cold"	Marc Broussard, Radney Foster, Justin Tocket	4:31
8.	"Exotica"	Marcus Miller	5:28
9.	"Rainy Night in Georgia"	Tony Joe White	4:50
10.	"One Like You"	David Garfield, William "Smokey" Robinson	4:41
11.	"Living in High Definition"	Lamont Dozier	7:14
12.	"Sailing"	Christopher Cross	5:15

DVD-Audio / Japanese SHM-CD bonus track
No.	Title	Writer(s)	Length
13.	"It Ain't Over"	Norman Brown	4:06

== Personnel ==
Musicians

- George Benson – vocals (1–12), guitar (1, 3–13), guitar solo (2)
- Bruno Cardozo – Hammond B3 organ (1), keyboards (12)
- William Magalhães – Rhodes electric piano (1, 12)
- Greg Phillinganes – keyboards (2, 4, 5, 8), acoustic piano (3, 11), Rhodes electric piano (6, 7, 9)
- Rod Temperton – keyboards (2), programming (2)
- David Paich – keyboards (3), programming (3)
- Steve Porcaro – synthesizers (3)
- Bobby Sparks – Hammond B3 organ (4, 6, 7, 9, 13), keyboards (6)
- David Garfield – acoustic piano (10), keyboards (10), organ (10), backing vocals (10)
- Robbie Benson – keyboards (13)
- Toninho Horta – acoustic guitar (1, 12)
- Paul Jackson Jr. – guitars (2, 3)
- John "Jubu" Smith – guitars (2–5, 7–11)
- Steve Lukather – guitar (3)
- Ray Parker Jr. – guitars (3)
- Norman Brown – guitar (6), vocals (6)
- Wah Wah Watson – guitars (8, 11)
- Lee Ritenour – acoustic guitar (10), electric guitar (10)
- Marcelo Lima – acoustic guitar (12)
- Marcus Miller – bass (1–11, 13), Rhodes electric piano (2), keyboards (2, 13), marimba (2), horn programming (4), drum loop programming (6), percussion (7), vocals (7), percussion programming (10), programming (11, 13), vibraphone (11)
- Arthur Maia – fretless bass (12)
- John Robinson – drums (2–11, 13)
- Maguinho Alcântara – drums (12)
- Paulinho da Costa – percussion (1, 2, 4, 5, 7, 8, 10)
- Butterscotch – human beatbox (1)
- Noël Lee – wind chimes (12)
- Tom Scott – saxophones (3, 4, 7, 11), saxophone solos (7)
- Gerald Albright – saxophone solos (4)
- Charles Loper – trombone (3, 4, 7, 11)
- Chuck Findley – trumpet (3, 4, 7, 11)
- Gary Grant – trumpet (3, 4, 7, 11)
- Patti Austin – backing vocals (2, 4), vocals (8)
- Carolyn Perry – backing vocals (2, 4)
- Lori Perry – backing vocals (2, 4)
- Sharon Perry – backing vocals (2, 4)
- Lalah Hathaway – vocals (4)
- Smokey Robinson – backing vocals (10)
- J.J. Blair – backing vocals (10)
- Leslie Smith – backing vocals (10)

Music arrangements

- Victor Vanacore – string arrangements and conductor (1, 4, 5, 9), horn arrangements (4)
- Marcus Miller – string arrangements and conductor (2, 10, 11), arrangements (4–6, 8, 13), horn arrangements (11)
- Rod Temperton – arrangements (2)
- Jerry Hey – horn arrangements (3)
- David Paich – string arrangements and conductor (3), horn arrangements (3)
- Tom Scott – horn arrangements (7)
- J.J. Blair – BGV arrangements (10)
- David Garfield – BGV arrangements (10)
- Smokey Robinson – BGV arrangements (10)
- Leslie Smith – BGV arrangements (10)

Strings (Tracks 1–5, 9, 11)

- Mike Vacarro – contractor
- Robert Peterson – concertmaster
- Karl Egan – music preparation
- Joe McGuire – music preparation
- John Acosta – cello
- Maurice Grants – cello
- Steve Richards – cello
- Rudy Stein – cello
- John Hayhurst – viola
- Michael Molnau – viola
- Robin Ross – viola
- Evan Wilson – viola
- Sai Ly Acosta – violin
- Susan Chatman – violin
- Ronald Clark – violin
- Joel Derouin – violin
- Charles Everett – violin
- Gerry Hilera – violin
- Victoria Lanier – violin
- Dennis Molchan – violin
- Xiao Niu He – violin
- Todor Pelev – violin
- Kathleen Robertson – violin

== Production ==
- Noël Lee – executive producer
- John Burk – executive producer, producer
- Marcus Miller – producer
- Toninho Horta – associate producer (1, 12)
- Michael O'Neill – associate producer (1, 12)
- Forest Sprague – associate producer (1, 12)
- Steve Lukather – co-producer (3)
- David Paich – co-producer (3)
- David Garfield – production assistance (10)
- Mary Hogan – A&R administration
- Gerald McCauley – A&R production consultant
- Michele Aristy – assistant to Marcus Miller
- Larissa Collins – art direction
- Greg Allen – art direction, package design, photography
- Stephanie Gonzalez – artist representative for Apropos Management and Marketing

Technical credits

- Doug Sax – mastering
- Sangwook "Sunny" Nam – mastering
- The Mastering Lab (Ojai, California) – mastering location
- Don Murray – recording, mixing
- J.J. Blair – recording
- Guilherme Canaes – recording
- Jeff Harris – recording
- Taka Honda – recording
- Stefan Nordin – recording
- Seth Presant – recording
- John Wroble – recording
- Noel Zancanella – recording
- Steve Cohen – assistant engineer
- Martin Cooke – assistant engineer
- Tom Syrowski – assistant engineer
- Aaron Walk – assistant engineer
