= Never Gonna Give You Up (Musical Youth song) =

1983 single by Musical Youth

Single by Musical Youth

from the album The Youth of Today
- Released: 4 February 1983
- Recorded: 1982
- Genre: Reggae; reggae-pop
- Length: 3:12 (7" version); 3:00 (album version)
- Label: MCA
- Songwriters: Freddie Waite; Musical Youth
- Producer: Peter Collins

Musical Youth singles chronology
| "Youth of Today" (1982) | "Never Gonna Give You Up" (1983) | "Heartbreaker" (1983) |

"Never Gonna Give You Up" is a song by reggae band Musical Youth, released in February 1983 as the third single from their debut album The Youth of Today. It peaked at number 6 on the UK Singles Chart.

== Reception ==
Reviewing the song for Record Mirror, Robin Smith wrote "Musical Youth could put a smile on the face of a condemned man. Infectious reggae that's instantly acceptable even for a usually miserable sod like me. If it was possible to have this blasting out of speakers across the country, then Britain would be a far happier place, brothers and sisters".

== Music video ==
The music video was directed by Don Letts and filmed in Jamaica, with part of it showing the band performing at Titchfield High School in Port Antonio. Dennis Seaton said that "I don't think [the children] really knew that we played our instruments. They was asking us why we became singers and we started telling them all the time that we played the instruments too".

== Releases ==
In the UK and Europe, the 7-inch single was released with two B-sides: "Rub 'n' Dub" and "Jim'll Fix It", the latter of which was a cover of the theme song of the British television show of the same name. However, in the US and Canada, the single was released with only "Rub 'n' Dub" as the B-side. There were several different versions of the 12-inch single released. In Europe, the single was released with "Rub 'n' Dub" as the B-side with both songs being extended versions, subtitled on the sleeve as 'Special 12" Version'. In the UK, "Never Gonna Give You Up" and "Run 'n' Dub" were released as a double A-side single, with the former being the Special 12" Version, whereas the latter was a special dub mix by Paul "Groucho" Smyke. In the US and Canada a 'New Mix' of the Special 12" Version of "Never Gonna Give You Up" was released, lasting over 10 minutes long. Two B-sides were released with this: "Mirror Mirror" and the extended version of "Rub 'n' Dub".

== Track listings ==
7" (UK & Europe)

1. "Never Gonna Give You Up" – 3:12
2. "Rub 'n' Dub" – 3:50
3. "Jim'll Fix It" – 2:35

7" (US & Canada)

1. "Never Gonna Give You Up" – 3:12
2. "Rub 'n' Dub" – 3:50

12" (Europe)

1. "Never Gonna Give You Up" – 6:28
2. "Rub 'n' Dub" – 6:15

12" (US & Canada)

1. "Never Gonna Give You Up" – 10:33
2. "Mirror Mirror" – 2:37
3. "Rub 'n' Dub" – 6:15

12" (UK)

1. "Rub 'n' Dub" – 6:30
2. "Never Gonna Give You Up" – 6:28

== Charts ==
| Chart (1983) | Peak position |
|---|---|
| Belgium (Ultratop 50 Flanders) | 28 |
| France (IFOP) | 82 |
| Iceland (RÚV) | 4 |
| Ireland (IRMA) | 5 |
| UK Singles (OCC) | 6 |
