= The Aces (Jamaican group) =

Former Jamaican vocal group

- Origin: Kingston, Jamaica
- Genres: Ska, rocksteady, reggae
- Years active: 1965–early 1980s
- Past members: Clive Campbell; Barry Howard; Carl Howard; Patrick Johnson; Winston Samuels

The Aces, originally known as The Four Aces, were a Jamaican vocal group who are best known for their work with Desmond Dekker.

== History ==
The initial line-up of The Aces consisted of Clive Campbell, Barry Howard, Carl Howard, and Patrick Howard. The group came to the attention of Dekker, who supported them when they auditioned for Leslie Kong at Beverley's studio in 1965. Kong employed the group as backing singers for Dekker and they can be heard on the song "Get Up Adinah" (credited as The Four Aces). They provided the backing vocals on Dekker's major hit "007 (Shanty Town)" as well as the track "Music Like Dirt (Intensified '68)" (the winning song of the 1968 Jamaica Independence Festival Song Contest). By 1967, the only remaining members were Barry Howard and Winston Samuels and it was their backing vocals that featured on Dekker's track, "Israelites". Dekker's international success led to him touring overseas, although The Aces did not accompany him due to Samuels refusal to fly (Samuels stating that "Rastas did not fly on iron birds") and Barry Howard's decision to emigrate to the United States. The Aces continued to record under their own name (without Dekker) and had a Jamaican hit in 1970 with "Mademoiselle Ninette". By 1971 the line-up had changed again, with Barry Howard now rejoined by Carl Hall. A string of hits followed with "Reggae Motion", "Take a Look", "Oh I Miss You", "Call Me Number One", "Be My Baby", and "Sad Sad Song". Their song "Working on it Night and Day", entered the pop charts in 1973. Little more was heard from the group until 1982 when they released "One Way Street".

== Members ==
- Clive Campbell (1965)
- Easton Barrington "Barry" Howard (1965–1969)
- Carl Howard
- Patrick Howard
- Patrick Johnson (1965)
- Winston James Samuels (left 1969, died 2017)
