= The Youth of Today =

Studio album by Musical Youth
- Released: 22 October 1982
- Recorded: June−September 1982
- Genre: Reggae
- Length: 40:24
- Label: MCA
- Producer: Peter Collins

Musical Youth chronology
The Youth of Today (1982)	Different Style! (1983)

Singles from The Youth of Today
- 1. "Pass the Dutchie" Released: 10 September 1982; 2. "Youth of Today" Released: 12 November 1982; 3. "Never Gonna Give You Up" Released: 4 February 1983; 4. "Heartbreaker" Released: 8 April 1983

The Youth of Today is the debut album from the British Jamaican reggae band Musical Youth, released in 1982. The album includes the number one UK hit "Pass the Dutchie" which also hit number 10 on the US Billboard Hot 100 chart.

The album became their most successful release, peaking at the twenty third position of the Billboard 200 and the twenty fourth place in the UK Albums Chart.

== Background ==
Professional ratings
Review scores
Source	Rating
Allmusic	4.5/5 stars
Reggae Reviews	4/5 stars

The album was released shortly after the success of "Pass the Dutchie", which is the album's opening song. The Youth of Today contains twelve reggae tracks, written by Freddie Waite and Musical Youth themselves, and produced by Peter Collins. Some subsequent releases omitted "Gone Straight" and "Rub 'n' Dub", and had the rest of the tracks in a re-arranged order. The album included a colourful comic story on its inner sleeve, designed by Lon Goddard, as well as a big Musical Youth poster. The cover photograph is credited to Eric Watson.

"Pass the Dutchie" was the album's lead single, released to great commercial success. It scored a number one position in no less than five countries and earned a Grammy Award nomination. A rapid follow-up, "Youth of Today", was released at the end of 1982 and achieved respectable chart success. The third single, "Never Gonna Give You Up", released in early 1983, became the band's second biggest hit in the United Kingdom and Ireland. The album's fourth and final single, "Heartbreaker", didn't fare as well and charted only in the UK, outside the top 40.

The Youth of Today was released to positive reviews and commercial success. It peaked at number 24 in the United Kingdom and number 23 in the United States. It fared much better in France and Canada, where it peaked at number 13 and number 8 respectively. The album was certified Gold in both the UK and Canada.

== Track listing ==
=== Full LP release ===
Side A

1. "Pass the Dutchie" (Jackie Mittoo, Fitzroy "Bunny" Simpson, Lloyd "Judge" Ferguson) – 3:25
2. "Heartbreaker" (Freddie Waite) – 3:45
3. "Gone Straight" (Freddie Waite) – 3:08
4. "Blind Boy" (Musical Youth) – 3:50
5. "Rockers" (Musical Youth) – 3:00
6. "Youth of Today" (Musical Youth, Freddie Waite) – 2:56

Side B

1. "Young Generation" (Musical Youth) – 3:20
2. "Mirror Mirror" (Freddie Waite) – 3:50
3. "Children of Zion" (Musical Youth, Freddie Waite) – 3:00
4. "Never Gonna Give You Up" (Musical Youth, Freddie Waite) – 3:00
5. "Rub 'n' Dub" (Musical Youth) – 3:50
6. "Schoolgirl" (Musical Youth) – 3:20

=== Abridged MCA release ===
Side A

1. "Pass the Dutchie" (Jackie Mittoo, Fitzroy "Bunny" Simpson, Lloyd "Judge" Ferguson) – 3:25
2. "Children of Zion" (Musical Youth, Freddie Waite) – 3:00
3. "Blind Boy" (Musical Youth) – 3:50
4. "Rockers" (Musical Youth) – 3:00
5. "Youth of Today" (Musical Youth, Freddie Waite) – 2:56

Side B

1. "Young Generations" (Musical Youth) – 3:20
2. "Mirror Mirror" (Freddie Waite) – 3:50
3. "Heartbreaker" (Freddie Waite) – 3:45
4. "Never Gonna Give You Up" (Musical Youth, Freddie Waite) – 3:00
5. "Schoolgirl" (Musical Youth) – 3:20

== Personnel ==
Musical Youth

- Dennis Seaton – vocals, percussion
- Freddie "Junior" Waite – drums, vocals
- Kelvin Grant – guitars, vocals
- Michael Grant – keyboards, vocals
- Patrick Waite – bass

Technical

- Julian Mendelsohn, Pete Hammond, Richard Dodd – engineer
- Eric Watson – photography

== Charts and certifications ==
=== Charts ===
Chart (1983)	Peak position
United Kingdom	24
Australia (Kent Music Report)	80
Canada	8
France	13
Netherlands	23
New Zealand	42
Spain (AFYVE)	11
US Billboard 200	23
US Top R&B/Black Albums (Billboard)	11

=== Certifications and sales ===
Country	Certification
United Kingdom	Gold (+100,000)
Canada	Gold (+50,000)
