= Youth of Today (song) =

Single by Musical Youth

from the album The Youth of Today
- B-side: "Gone Straight"
- Released: 12 November 1982
- Recorded: 1982
- Genre: Reggae; reggae-pop
- Length: 2:56 (7" version); 5:28 (12" version)
- Label: MCA
- Songwriter(s): Freddie Waite; Musical Youth
- Producer(s): Peter Collins

Musical Youth singles chronology
"Pass the Dutchie" (1982)	"Youth of Today" (1982)	"Never Gonna Give You Up" (1983)

"Youth of Today" is a song by the British-Jamaican reggae band Musical Youth, released in November 1982 as the second single from their debut album The Youth of Today. It peaked at number 13 on the UK Singles Chart, and was a top 10 hit in the Netherlands, Belgium and Ireland.

== Reception ==
Reviewing for Smash Hits, Neil Tennant wondered "if it was a good idea for Musical Youth to have to produce a follow-up quite so quickly. This is warm and bouncy but lacks the array of hooks the formidable array of hooks that "Pass The Dutchie" possessed". John Shearlaw for Record Mirror described it as "a more or less original composition strongly reminiscent of Pat Kelly ('I'm In Love With You') that stays sweet and neat but is nothing like hard enough to bash the charts. Or indeed the ears".

== Music video ==
The music video for the song was directed by Don Letts and was filmed in London in October 1982.

== Track listings ==
7" single

1. "Youth of Today" – 2:56
2. "Gone Straight" – 3:08

12" maxi-single

1. "Youth of Today" (Special 12" Club Version) – 5:28
2. "Gone Straight" – 5:22

== Charts ==
Chart (1982–83)	Peak position
Australia (Kent Music Report)	99
Belgium (Ultratop 50 Flanders)	7
Ireland (IRMA)	9
Netherlands (Single Top 100)	4
New Zealand (Recorded Music NZ)	19
Spain (AFYVE)	12
UK Singles (OCC)	13
West Germany (GfK)	29
