= Musical Youth =

British reggae band

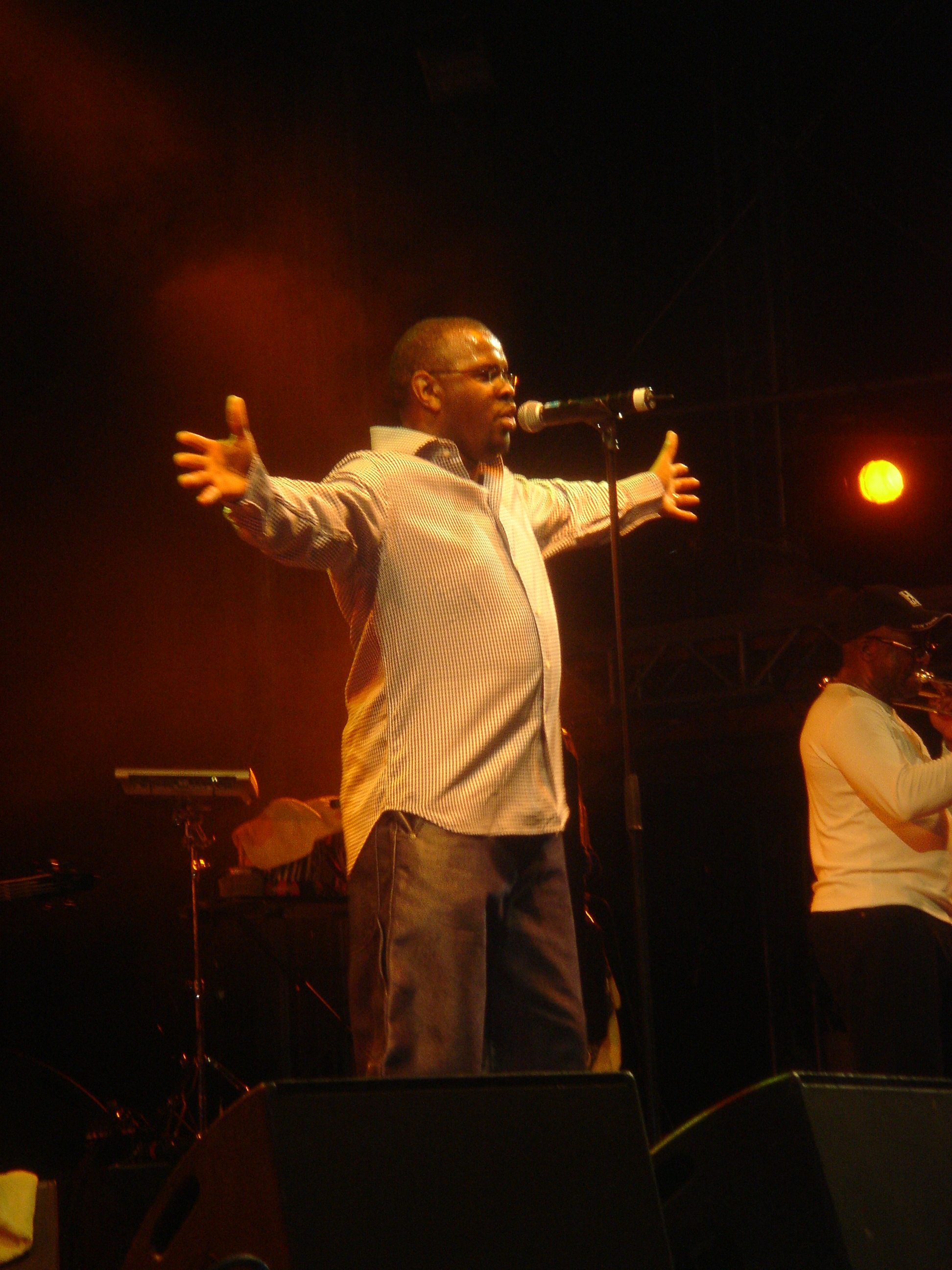
- Musical Youth lead vocalist Dennis Seaton performing in Austria, 2005

Background information
- Origin: Birmingham, England
- Genres: Reggae; R&B
- Years active: 1979–1985; 2001–present
- Label: MCA
- Members: Dennis Seaton; Michael Grant
- Past members: Kelvin Grant; Freddie "Junior" Waite; Patrick Waite

Musical Youth are a British reggae band formed in 1979 in Birmingham, England. They are best known for their 1982 single "Pass the Dutchie", which was number 1 in multiple charts around the world. Their other songs include "Youth of Today", "Never Gonna Give You Up", and a collaboration with Donna Summer, "Unconditional Love". Musical Youth recorded two albums and earned a Grammy Award nomination before disbanding in 1985 after a series of personal problems. The band returned in 2001 as a duo.

== History ==
The fathers of two pairs of brothers, Kelvin and Michael Grant and Frederick (known as Junior) and Patrick Waite, formed a group in 1979 featuring their sons. The Waites' father, Frederick Waite Sr., had been a member of the Jamaican reggae group the Techniques. At the start of Musical Youth's career, he sang lead with Junior. Musical Youth were influenced by reggae artists such as Sugar Minott, Aswad, Gregory Isaacs, Dennis Brown, John Holt and Beshara. Although schoolboys (attending Duddeston Manor School), the group managed to secure gigs at different Birmingham pubs and released a double single in 1981, including songs "Generals" and "Political", on a local label 021 Records, named after the then-Birmingham area code. An appearance on BBC Radio 1 John Peel's evening show brought further attention to the group, and they were signed to MCA Records. By that time, Frederick Waite Jr. was replaced by Dennis Seaton as the group's lead singer.

In September 1982, the group issued the single "Pass the Dutchie", adapted from the Mighty Diamonds' "Pass the Kouchie". The record went to number one in the UK Singles Chart in October 1982, as well as Ireland, The Netherlands, Australia, New Zealand, and Canada. It also reached the top 10 on the Billboard Hot 100 chart in the United States, and went on to sell over four million copies. Musical Youth would also be the first black act to have a music video played on the newly founded channel MTV. Their debut album The Youth of Today, released in the same year, placed in the top 40 in the UK, West Germany and the US, and the top 10 in Canada. It was certified gold in the UK and Canada. The follow-up singles, "Youth of Today", released at the end of the year, and "Never Gonna Give You Up", released early in 1983, reached number 13 and 6 in the UK, respectively, and were moderately successful in the international charts. The next single, "Heartbreaker", was only a minor UK success.

The band released the new single "Tell Me Why" in mid-1983, a cover of a 1974 John Holt song, which reached the top 40 in several European countries. The follow-up, a cover of Desmond Dekker's "007" was a moderate hit only in the British market. In the meantime, the group featured on Donna Summer's song "Unconditional Love" which was a hit in the UK, reaching number 14. They also took part in her 1983 TV special A Hot Summer Night with Donna. Musical Youth's second album, Different Style!, was released in 1983 and showcased a more R&B-influenced repertoire to make the band more accessible in North America. It was reflected in the lead single in that market, "She's Trouble", but it only achieved minor success. The album itself turned out a commercial failure on both European and American markets, though the band received a nomination for the Best New Artist award at the 26th Grammy Awards. After one final UK hit in early 1984 with "Sixteen", featuring Jody Watley, their commercial success ended and the next two singles, "Whatcha Talking 'Bout" and "Let's Go to the Moon", penned by Stevie Wonder and Eddy Grant, respectively, failed to enter the charts.

With their careers going downhill, the band members became embroiled in legal, financial and personal problems. In 1985, Dennis Seaton left the band, leading to its dissolution. In 1989, he released a solo album Imagine That... which passed without success. Plans for a reunion of Musical Youth were halted when Patrick Waite suddenly died in February 1993, at the age of 24, having collapsed at home from a hereditary heart condition, awaiting a court appearance. 1994 saw the release of a compilation album, Anthology, and a single with remixes of "Pass the Dutchie", followed by another compilation, Maximum Volume... The Best of Musical Youth, in 1995. Michael Grant co-founded the band 5am which released two singles in 1996, and went on to produce remixes for Da Brat, Kelly Rowland, and Lemar, among others. In 2000, they founded 5am Records, a label focused mainly on R&B and gospel music. Seaton formed his own band, XMY, and opened a car rental company. Junior Waite had been suffering from mental illness, and his former bandmates stated that he was unlikely to recover.

In 2001, Dennis Seaton and Michael Grant reformed Musical Youth as a duo. The planned tour was cancelled due to the September 11 attacks, but in 2003, the band performed as part of the Here and Now tour, an annual series of nostalgia concerts featuring musicians of the 1980s. They featured on Pato Banton's 2004 single "Pretty Woman", and performed at a festival in Wiesen, Austria in 2005. The band's new music was made available for purchase exclusively from their website. In 2008, Musical Youth released a re-recorded version of "Pass the Dutchie", followed by a cover of Boney M.'s "Mary's Boy Child – Oh My Lord" in 2009, and Jimmy Cliff's "The Harder They Come" in 2013. The latter was the lead single from their new album, initially titled Reggae for the People and later renamed When Reggae Was King. It was scheduled for release in 2016, but after several pushbacks, it was eventually released on CD in March 2018 and in digital distribution in 2020. Former member Kelvin Grant has continued a solo career, performing and releasing new material, most recently the album Defend Them in 2018.

Frederick Waite Jr. (born on 23 May 1967) died in Birmingham on 20 July 2022, at the age of 55. His death was announced on 11 August. An inquest into his death recorded the cause of death as "sudden unexpected death in schizophrenia". He died at a mental health unit where he had been undergoing treatment for schizophrenia.

== Band members ==
- Frederick Waite Sr. — lead vocals (1979–1981)
- Dennis Seaton — lead vocals and percussion (1982–1985; 2001–present)
- Michael Grant — keyboards and backing vocals (1979–1985; 2001–present)
- Kelvin Grant — electric guitar and backing vocals (1979–1985)
- Freddie "Junior" Waite — drums and backing vocals (1979–1985; died 2022)
- Patrick Waite — bass guitar (1979–1985; died 1993)

== Discography ==
=== Studio albums ===
Year	Title	Peak chart positions								Certifications
Year	Title	UK	AUS	CAN	GER	NL	NZ	US	US R&B	Certifications
1982	The Youth of Today	24	80	8	23	23	42	23	11	UK: Gold; CAN: Gold
1983	Different Style!	—	—	90	—	—	—	144	50	
2018	When Reggae Was King	—	—	—	—	—	—	—	—	

=== Compilations ===
- 1987: Pass the Dutchie
- 1994: Anthology
- 1995: Maximum Volume... The Best of Musical Youth
- 2004: 20th Century Masters – The Millennium Collection: The Best of Musical Youth
- 2026: Mash Down Birmingham: The Early Recordings Of Musical Youth

=== EPs ===
- 2011: Christmas EP

=== Singles ===
Year	Title	Peak chart positions										Certifications	Album
Year	Title	UK	AUS	BEL	CAN	GER	IRE	NL	NZ	US	US R&B	Certifications	Album
1981	"Generals"/"Political"	—	—	—	—	—	—	—	—	—	—		—N/a
1982	"Pass the Dutchie"	1	1	1	1	2	1	1	1	10	8	UK: Gold; CAN: Platinum; FRA: Gold	The Youth of Today
1982	"Youth of Today"	13	99	7	—	29	9	4	19	—	—		The Youth of Today
1983	"Never Gonna Give You Up"	6	—	28	—	—	5	—	—	—	—		The Youth of Today
1983	"Heartbreaker"	44	—	—	—	—	—	—	—	—	68		The Youth of Today
1983	"Tell Me Why"	33	—	35	—	—	20	31	—	—	—		Different Style!
1983	"Unconditional Love" (with Donna Summer)	14	57	—	48	—	28	—	24	43	9		She Works Hard for the Money
1983	"007"	26	—	—	—	—	27	—	—	—	—		Different Style!
1983	"She's Trouble"	87	—	—	43	—	—	—	—	65	25		Different Style!
1984	"Sixteen" (with Jody Watley)	23	—	—	—	—	27	—	—	—	—		Different Style!
1984	"Whatcha Talking 'Bout"	—	—	—	—	—	—	—	—	—	81		Different Style!
1984	"Let's Go to the Moon"	—	—	—	—	—	—	—	—	—	—		—N/a
1994	"Pass the Dutchie" (remixes)	—	—	—	—	—	—	—	—	—	—		Maximum Volume...
2004	"Pretty Woman" (with Pato Banton)	—	—	—	—	—	—	—	—	—	—		—N/a
2008	"Pass the Dutchie" (re-recording)	—	—	—	—	—	—	—	—	—	—		Christmas EP
2009	"Mary's Boy Child/Oh My Lord"	—	—	—	—	—	—	—	—	—	—		Christmas EP
2013	"The Harder They Come"	—	—	—	—	—	—	—	—	—	—		When Reggae Was King
2016	"Pass the Dutchie" (Odjbox Remix)	—	—	—	—	—	—	—	—	—	—		—N/a
2019	"Pass the Dutchie" (Star Slinger Remix)	—	—	—	—	—	—	—	—	—	—		—N/a
2020	"Sharing the Night Together"	—	—	—	—	—	—	—	—	—	—		When Reggae Was King
2020	"Pass the Dutchie 21"	—	—	—	—	—	—	—	—	—	—		When Reggae Was King
