= Guitar Man (George Benson album) =

Studio album by George Benson
- Released: October 4, 2011
- Studios: The Village Studios (Los Angeles, California); Entourage Studios (North Hollywood, California); Visual Rhythm Studios (Alhambra, California); Porcupine Studios (London, UK); DB Studios (Tel Aviv, Israel)
- Genre: Jazz
- Length: 42:56
- Label: Concord
- Producers: John Burk; David Garfield

George Benson chronology
Songs and Stories (2009)	Guitar Man (2011)	Inspiration: A Tribute to Nat King Cole (2013)

Singles from Guitar Man
- 1. "The Lady in My Life" Released: September 26, 2011; 2. "Tequila" Released: 2012; 3. "Fingerlero" Released: 2012

Professional ratings
Review scores
Source	Rating
Allmusic	3.5/5 stars

Guitar Man is a studio album by George Benson. The album was released by Concord Jazz on October 4, 2011. Largely instrumental, it finds Benson revisiting his 1960s/early 1970s guitar playing roots with a twelve-song collection of covers of both jazz and pop standards overseen by producer John Burk.

== Track listing ==
No.	Title	Writer(s)	Length
1.	"Tenderly"	Jack Lawrence, Walter Gross	2:01
2.	"I Want to Hold Your Hand"	John Lennon, Paul McCartney	5:10
3.	"My Cherie Amour"	Henry Cosby, Sylvia Moy, Stevie Wonder	4:08
4.	"Naima"	John Coltrane	3:41
5.	"Tequila"	Daniel Flores	4:30
6.	"Don't Know Why"	Jesse Harris	2:45
7.	"The Lady in My Life"	Rod Temperton	4:30
8.	"My One and Only Love"	Robert Mellin, Guy Wood	3:24
9.	"Paper Moon"	Harold Arlen, E.Y. Harburg, Billy Rose	2:44
10.	"Danny Boy"	Frederic Weatherly	3:26
11.	"Since I Fell for You"	Buddy Johnson	2:58
12.	"Fingerlero"	Ronnie Foster	3:39

Best Buy bonus tracks
No.	Title	Writer(s)	Length
13.	"Sophisticated Lady"	Duke Ellington, Irving Mills, Mitchell Parish	1:36
14.	"Maria"	Leonard Bernstein, Stephen Sondheim	2:13
15.	"Send In the Clowns"	Stephen Sondheim	1:28

Official site purchase bonus tracks
No.	Title	Writer(s)	Length
13.	"Maria"	Leonard Bernstein, Stephen Sondheim	2:13
14.	"Somewhere"	Leonard Bernstein, Stephen Sondheim	1:54

Qobuz / iTunes bonus track
No.	Title	Writer(s)	Length
13.	"People"	Bob Merrill, Jule Styne	1:47

Japanese bonus track
No.	Title	Writer(s)	Length
13.	"Sophisticated Lady"	Duke Ellington, Irving Mills, Mitchell Parish	1:36

== Personnel ==
Credits taken from Japan release.

Musicians

- George Benson – guitar, vocals (3, 8, 11–13)
- David Garfield – acoustic piano (2, 4, 11), keyboards (2–8, 12, 13)
- Joe Sample – acoustic piano (5, 8, 9, 12)
- Chris Walden – keyboards (7)
- Ray Fuller – rhythm guitar (2)
- Paul Jackson Jr. – rhythm guitar (2)
- Freddie Washington – bass (2)
- Ben Williams – bass (3–5, 7–9, 12, 13)
- Oscar Seaton Jr. – drums (2)
- Harvey Mason – drums (3–5, 7–9, 12, 13)
- Lenny Castro – percussion (3, 5, 6, 12)
- Dan Higgins – alto flute (2), clarinet (2), flute (2)
- Charlie Bisharat – viola (2, 7), violin (2, 7)

Music arrangements

- George Benson – arrangements (2–6, 8, 9)
- David Garfield – arrangements (2, 4, 8, 11–13), rhythm arrangements (7)
- Oscar Castro-Neves – orchestral arrangements (2)
- Chris Walden – string arrangements (7)

== Production ==
- Noel Lee – executive producer
- John Beck – executive producer, producer
- David Garfield – co-producer (2, 4, 6, 8, 11)
- Larissa Collins – art direction
- Greg Allen – art direction, package design
- Marco Glaviano – photography
- Stephanie Gonzalez – artist representative for Apropos Management and Marketing

Technical credits

- Paul Blakemore – mastering at CMG Mastering (Cleveland, Ohio)
- Seth Presant – mixing, recording (1, 3–13)
- Al Schmitt – recording (1, 3–13)
- Mauricio Cajueiro – recording (2)
- Geoff Gillette – recording (2)
- Yutaka Yokokura – recording (2)
- Aaron Walk – assistant engineer
- Aran Lavi – additional recording
- Aaron Mattes – assistant additional engineer
- Sye Avshalom – second assistant engineer
