= The Blackstones =

- Origin: London, England
- Genre: Reggae
- Years active: 1974–Present

The Blackstones are a United Kingdom-based reggae vocal trio formed in 1974, in the tradition of the Jamaican harmony-trio.

The Blackstones comprised the brothers Leon, Byron, and Neville Leiffer. One of the group's early singles, "We Nah Go Suffer", was released on the Daddy Kool and topped the British reggae chart. This success led to recording sessions with Phil Pratt using rhythm tracks recorded at Channel One Studios in Kingston, Jamaica, and vocals added at Chalk Farm studios. These sessions resulted in the debut album Insight, released in 1979.

By 1983, the line-up had changed, with Leon Leiffer joined by Tony Douglas and Ken Kendricks. Their Take Another Look at Love album topped the reggae albums chart, the title track being similarly successful as a single. In 1985 the group contributed to the British Reggae Artists Famine Appeal charity single "Let’s Make Africa Green Again", released by Island Records. Further reggae chart hits followed in the mid 1980s, before the group became the backing band for Lance Ellington. Although they never repeated their earlier success they remained popular, especially with Jamaican fans. By 2004, the line-up had again changed, with Leon Leiffer now joined by Tony Mahoney and Junior Bailey. They were one of the last artists to work with Clement "Coxsone" Dodd, signing a deal with his Studio One label and recording the album Tribute to Studio One shortly before he died in 2004.

Since 2019 The Blackstones are a quartet, Leon Leiffer, Tony Mahoney, Junior Bailey, AJ Franklin.

== Discography ==
- Insight (1979) Burning Rockers
- Take Another Look at Love (1983) Pressure
- Silhouettes (1995) Jah Larry
- Outburst (1995) Prestige
- Riding High (1996) Prestige
- Somebody Ought to Write About It (1997) Prestige
- Colours of Love Body Music
- Unlimited (2000) Quartz Records
- Greater Power (2006) Jet Star
- Tribute to Studio One (2007) Studio One
- The Blackstones Meet the Chosen Few (2007) Organized Crime (with The Chosen Few)
- 100% Niceness (2008) Jetstar
- Salute Slim Smith and the Uniques (2011)
- We Can Do It (2015)
- Mellow Mood (2017)
- Got What It Takes (2019)
- The Blackstones & The Officinalis - Change Of Plan (2020)
