= The Lady in My Life =

Song by Michael Jackson

from the album Thriller
- Released: November 29, 1982
- Recorded: 1982
- Studio: Westlake (Los Angeles, California)
- Genre: R&B; quiet storm; soul; pop
- Length: 5:00
- Label: Epic; CBS
- Songwriter: Rod Temperton
- Producer: Quincy Jones

"The Lady in My Life" is a song by American singer-songwriter Michael Jackson which was written by Rod Temperton and produced by Quincy Jones. It is included on the Thriller album by Jackson and along with "Baby Be Mine" is one of only two songs from the album that were not released as an A-side single; as "Baby Be Mine" appeared as the B-side for the "Human Nature" single (as well as the B-side on the lead single "I Just Can't Stop Loving You" from "Bad" in 1987), it is the only song on the record to never be released as a single at all.

== Critical reception ==
In a 2016 retrospective for Billboard, writer Andrew Unterberger lauded the song [and other non-single "Baby Be Mine"] as "earn[ing] every bit of the real estate they command on the biggest nine-track album in history." Speaking on "The Lady In My Life" particularly, he considered the song "substantial enough a work to be selected as the LP’s closer — [it] is one of Michael’s finest quiet-storm slow burns, an ode of romantic commitment that also gives subconscious closure to "She's Out of My Life," the heart-rending breakup ballad from previous album Off the Wall. Vibe also praised the song, considering it "the ultimate love song". On a Billboard 2022 ranked list of the entire album, the song placed sixth, with writer Chuck Arnold considering the record "seductive soul", before comparing its quiet storm structure and "grown... slow-jamm[y]" vibe to fellow Motown vocalist Marvin Gaye. Music publication American Songwriter praised the simplicity of the song, arguing that it "stacks up against any ballad the former Motowner put out during his career. It’s simple. It’s romantic. It has everything you’d want in a slow jam from Jackson."

== Sampling ==
"The Lady in My Life" has frequently been sampled in pop and hip-hop music, though often in a higher key than the original recording. Songs that sample it include:

- "Hey Lover" by LL Cool J featuring Boyz II Men
- "1st of tha Month (Remix)" by Bone Thugs-n-Harmony
- "Swang" by Trae featuring Big Hawk
- "Porno Movie" by Three 6 Mafia
- "I Wanna Smoke" by Gangsta Pat
- "Coolie High (Paradise Remix)" by Camp Lo
- "Daytona 500" by Ghostface Killah featuring Raekwon and Cappadona
- "95 Like Dat" by Tyga
- "Transparency" by Chris Brown
- "Lover's Ghetto" by Angie Stone
- "Vows" by Knucks
- "Meal Ticket" by Daz Dillinger and Krayzie Bone
- "Need That Love" by Omarion and Bow Wow
- "Lady In My Life" by Gunslinguz featuring Half Note
- "Irrelevant" by K. Michelle
- "Keep It Street" by Concrete Click

== Cover versions ==
- On Stanley Jordan's 1985 Billboard Jazz Chart number one and Grammy nominated album, Magic Touch, Jordan performs an instrumental version of the song using a guitar tapping technique.
- An instrumental cover version by George Benson, from his 2011 album Guitar Man, went to number-one for two weeks on the Billboard Smooth Jazz Airplay chart in February 2012. He previously worked with the song's writer, producer, and three of the personnel (Johnson, Phillinganes and Boddicker) on his Give Me the Night album in 1980.
- American R&B singer Maxwell performed the song at the 2022 Billboard Music Awards to promote Thriller 40, a 40th anniversary reissue of the album with a second disc of unreleased songs and demos from the original sessions.

== Personnel ==
Personnel as listed in the album's liner notes are:

- Songwriting by Rod Temperton
- Music Production by Quincy Jones
- Mastering by Bernie Grundman
- Bass: Louis Johnson
- Drums: Jeff Porcaro
- Electric guitar: Paul Jackson
- Keyboards: Greg Phillinganes
- Synthesizer: David Paich & Steve Porcaro
- Emulator: Michael Boddicker

== Certifications ==
Although "The Lady in My Life" was not released commercially as a physical single, in 2022 it was certified gold by the RIAA as a digital single.

Region	Certification	Certified units/sales
United States (RIAA)	Gold	500,000^{‡}
^{‡} Sales+streaming figures based on certification alone.
