= Kashief Lindo =

Jamaican reggae singer

KashieF Lindo
- Born: Kingston, Jamaica
- Genres: Reggae
- Years active: 1984–present
- Labels: HeavyBeat, Jet Star, VP

KashieF Lindo is a Jamaican reggae singer. Born in Jamaica, he migrated to the United States when he was 6.

== Career ==
Born in Kingston, Jamaica, Kashief is the son of guitarist and producer Willie Lindo. He moved with his family to Miami as a child. Kashief's first recording was produced by his father in 1992. He had a successful Jamaican single in 1993 with "Hard Times", based on the "Satta Massagana" rhythm, and recorded a popular version of "Killing Me Softly with His Song" in 1996.

In 1999 he released the album We Need Love, described in The Rough Guide to Reggae as "a lovely album of smooth romantic material sung in the purest of voices".

In 2012 he released the album A Reggae Tribute To Michael Jackson, featuring 18 reggae cover versions of Jackson's songs, with contributions from Robbie Shakespeare and Robbie Lyn.

== Discography ==
=== Albums ===
- Trouble Free (1993), HeavyBeat
- Push For Your Goal (1994), HeavyBeat
- Sings Christmas (1994), HeavyBeat
- Soul and Inspiration (1995), HeavyBeat/Jet Star
- What Kinda World (1997), VP
- We Need Love (1999), VP
- Love Knows the Way (2002), VP
- Music Is A Part of Me (2002), Overheat Japan
- Solid Soul (2004), HeavyBeat
- Keep on Keepin' On (2008), VP, HeavyBeat
- Outtake (2010), HeavyBeat
- A Reggae Tribute To Michael Jackson (2012), HeavyBeat
- Love On... (2021), HeavyBeat
