= Heartlands Academy =

Location
- 10 Great Francis Street; Nechells; Birmingham, West Midlands, B7 4QR; England; 52°29′17″N 1°52′31″W

Information
- Former names: Duddeston Manor School; Heartlands High School
- Type: Academy
- Motto: A place to empower dreams!
- Established: 1 September 2009
- Local authority: Birmingham
- Department for Education URN: 135907 Tables
- Chair of Ambassadorial Advisory Group: TBC
- Headteacher: Sophia Haughton
- Staff: 100
- Gender: Coeducational
- Age: 11 to 16
- Enrolment: 878
- Capacity: 950
- Colours: Red and Black
- Website: https://heartlandsacademy.e-act.org.uk/

Heartlands Academy is a coeducational secondary school located in the Nechells area of Birmingham, West Midlands, England.

Heartlands Academy offers GCSEs and BTECs for students at Key Stage 4. It is ranked the 11th best secondary school Birmingham, by progress 8 score.

== History ==
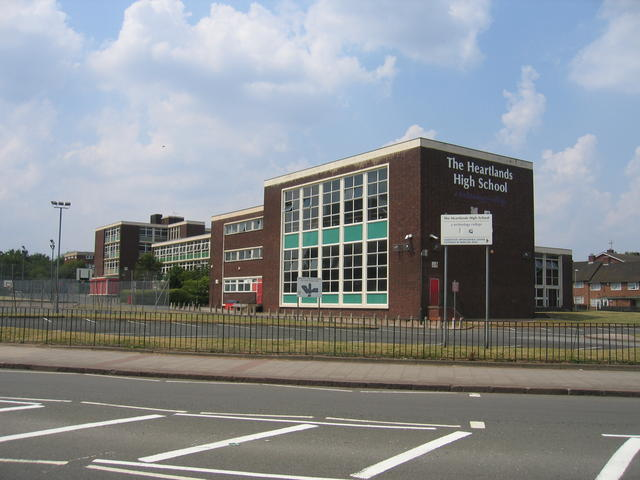
The former building as Heartlands High School in 2006

Originally known as Duddeston Manor School and then Heartlands High School, the school converted to academy status on 1 September 2009 and was renamed Heartlands Academy. The academy is sponsored by E-ACT and moved into a new building in 2012.

== GCSE results ==
Heartlands High School generally had low average percentages for 5+ GCSEs (or equivalent) A*-C including English & Mathematics in the past, with the lowest recorded being 11% in 2003. However, since then, the average percentage has steadily increased each year. Before the school turned into an academy in September 2009, the school had a percentage of 40% for the final year as Heartlands High School. Since becoming an academy in 2009, the results have been continuing to increase, reaching over 50% for the first time in 2012. Heartlands achieved their highest results in 2019, with 83% of students achieving a grade 4, equivalent to a low C.

Track Record:	2003	2004	2005	2006	2007	2008	2009	2010	2011	2012	2013	2014	2015	2016	2017	2018	2019
5+ GCSEs (or equivalent) A*-C incl. English & Maths Note: 2017, 2018, 2019 involve 9-1 exams	11%	13%	22%	29%	28%	30%	40%	47%	45%	56%	57%	54%	52%	72%	60%	69%	83%

Track Record:	2016	2017	2018	2019
Progress 8 Benchmark	0.22	0.25	0.6	1.47
Progress Description	Above Average	Above Average	Well Above Average	Well Above Average

== Ofsted Reports ==
Heartlands High School was placed into special measures by Ofsted in 2003. Since appointing a new principal and a strong leadership team, the school went to good and improving in three years. In 2009 Heartlands High School was awarded Outstanding, the highest mark achievable in school Ofsted inspections. Since academy conversion, Heartlands Academy has continued to be awarded outstanding in 2012 and 2014.

Inspection record:	March 2003	March 2006	February 2009	January 2012	February 2014
Ofsted	Special Measures	Good and Improving	Outstanding	Outstanding	Outstanding

== Principals ==
=== Heartlands Academy ===
Principals:

- 2003 - 2015 Glynis Jones

Headteachers:

- 2016 - 2016 Richard Tattersfield
- 2016 - 2017 Helen Tanner
- 2017 - 2019 Fuzel Choudhury
- 2019–2023 Jenifer Clegg

2023–present Sophia Haughton

  [16][17]

== Notable former pupils ==
=== Duddeston Manor School ===
- Ayoub Khan, politician and barrister
- Dennis Seaton, recording artist and record producer

=== Heartlands High School ===
- Jacob Banks, singer-songwriter
