= Pass the Dutchie =

Single by Musical Youth

from the album The Youth of Today
- B-side: "Please Give Love a Chance"
- Released: 10 September 1982
- Recorded: August 1982
- Genre: Reggae; new wave
- Length: 3:25; 6:05 (12" single version)
- Label: MCA
- Songwriters: Jackie Mittoo; Fitzroy "Bunny" Simpson; Lloyd "Judge" Ferguson
- Producers: Toney Owens; Pete Waterman; Peter Collins

Musical Youth singles chronology
"Generals" / "Political" (1981)	"Pass the Dutchie" (1982)	"Youth of Today" (1982)

Music video
- "Pass the Dutchie" on YouTube

"Pass the Dutchie" is a song performed by the British reggae band Musical Youth, taken from their debut studio album, The Youth of Today (1982). It was produced by Toney Owens from Kingston, Jamaica. The single peaked at the top of the UK Singles Chart. Outside the United Kingdom, "Pass the Dutchie" topped the charts in at least eight other countries, including Australia, Canada, New Zealand and Ireland, as well as peaking within the top ten of the charts in Iceland and the United States. The single sold over five million copies worldwide.

== Background ==
The song was the band's first release on a major label. Following a shouted intro taken from U Roy's "Rule the Nation" with words slightly altered, the track combined two songs: "Gimme the Music" by U Brown, and "Pass the Kouchie" by Mighty Diamonds, which deals with the recreational use of cannabis (kouchie being slang for a cannabis pipe). For the cover version, the song's title was bowdlerised to "Pass the Dutchie", the new word being a patois term for a Dutch oven, a type of cooking pot. All obvious drug references were removed from the lyrics; e.g., instead of the original "How does it feel when you got no herb?", the cover version refers to "food" instead. The song was commissioned by the record company to turn "Pass the Kouchie" into a radio friendly hit for a wider audience. Toney Owens came up with the modified lyrics after coming home one night on an empty stomach. Despite the lyrics being changed to specifically remove drug references, the word "dutchie" later became a slang term for cannabis as a result of the song.

The song was first championed by radio DJ Zach Diezel and became an instant hit when it was picked up by MCA Records in September 1982. It debuted at number 26 on the UK chart and rose to number one the following week. In February 1983, it reached number 10 on the Billboard Hot 100 singles chart in the US. Though they would have subsequent top 40 hits in other countries, "Pass the Dutchie" remains their only hit in the US. The song also scored the number one position in at least five other countries, eventually selling more than five million copies worldwide. After the song was featured in the Netflix series Stranger Things in 2022, it experienced a resurgence of popularity, re-entering a number of international charts.

== Music video ==
The video, directed by Don Letts, was shot partly on the south bank of the River Thames in London, by Lambeth Bridge.

The video begins with the band publicly performing the song and playing instruments in London. A school official runs across the city and disrupts their performance, seemingly attempting to arrest them, but he falls down and breaks his arm. The video features Julian Firth in a courtroom where the band is put on trial for the school inspector's injury. The band presents the court with their song, which is highly enjoyed. The trial ends with the jury finding the band not guilty, leading them to celebrate in the courtroom to the school inspector's dismay.

"Pass the Dutchie" was the first music video by black artists to appear on the American television channel MTV; it preceded Michael Jackson's "Billie Jean" to air by several months.

== Track listings ==
- 7" single

A. "Pass the Dutchie" – 3:25
B. "Please Give Love a Chance" – 3:36

- 12" single

A. "Pass the Dutchie" – 6:05
B. "Pass the Dutchie" (special dub mix) – 4:40

- CD maxi single (1994)
1. "Pass the Dutchie" (Molella mega club mix) – 4:20
2. "Pass the Dutchie" (Molella hard ragga mix) – 5:00
3. "Pass the Dutchie" (Molella radio mix) – 3:40
4. "Pass the Dutchie" (original 7" version) – 3:23
- Digital single (2008)
1. "Pass the Dutchie" (exclusive version) – 3:40
2. "Pass the Dutchie" (singalong version) – 3:40
- Digital maxi single (2011)
1. "Pass the Dutchie" (re-recorded / remastered) – 3:40
2. "Pass the Dutchie" (Dubstep Kings remix) – 4:05
3. "Pass the Dutchie" (singalong version) – 3:40
4. "Pass the Dutchie" (Dubstep Kings instrumental remix) – 4:05
- Digital single (2016)
1. "Pass the Dutchie" (Odjbox remix) – 3:42
- Digital single (2019)
1. "Pass the Dutchie" (Star Slinger remix) – 3:42
- Digital single (2020)
1. "Pass the Dutchie 21" – 4:33

== Charts and certifications ==
=== Weekly charts ===
1982–1983 weekly chart performance for "Pass the Dutchie"
Chart (1982–1983)	Peak position
Australia (Kent Music Report)	1
Austria (Ö3 Austria Top 40)	2
Belgium (Ultratop 50 Flanders)	1
Canada (The Record)	1
Canada Top Singles (RPM)	1
Iceland (RÚV)	10
Ireland (IRMA)	1
Netherlands (Dutch Top 40)	1
Netherlands (Single Top 100)	1
New Zealand (Recorded Music NZ)	1
Spain (AFYVE)	1
Sweden (Sverigetopplistan)	15
Switzerland (Schweizer Hitparade)	1
UK Singles (Official Charts)	1
US Billboard Hot 100	10
US Hot R&B/Hip-Hop Songs (Billboard)	8
US Dance Club Songs (Billboard)	11
West Germany (GfK)	2

2016 weekly chart performance for "Pass the Dutchie"
Chart (2016)	Peak position
France (SNEP)	99

2022 weekly chart performance for "Pass the Dutchie"
Chart (2022)	Peak position
Global 200 (Billboard)	108
Hungary (Single Top 40)	36
Iceland (Tónlistinn)	23
Lithuania (AGATA)	50
New Zealand (Recorded Music NZ)	20
UK Singles (OCC)	89

=== Year end charts ===
1982 year-end chart performance for "Pass the Dutchie"
Chart (1982)	Position
Australia (Kent Music Report)	58
Belgium (Ultratop Flanders)	21
Netherlands (Dutch Top 40)	4
Netherlands (Single Top 100)	5
New Zealand (Recorded Music NZ)	9

1983 year-end chart performance for "Pass the Dutchie"
Chart (1983)	Position
Australia (Kent Music Report)	47
US Top Pop Singles (Billboard)	91
West Germany (Official German Charts)	17

=== Certifications ===
Certifications for "Pass the Dutchie"
Region	Certification	Certified units/sales
Canada (Music Canada)	Platinum	100,000^{^}
Netherlands (NVPI)	Gold	50,000^{^}
New Zealand (RMNZ)	Platinum	30,000^{‡}
United Kingdom (BPI)	Gold	500,000^{^}
^{^} Shipments figures based on certification alone.^{‡} Sales+streaming figures based on certification alone.

== Cover versions ==
- The song was parodied by a band from the Seychelles Islands Dezil' under the title "Laisse tomber les filles (qui se maquillent)", and peaked at number 13 in France and number 47 in Switzerland in 2006.
