= List of Oberon-class submarines =

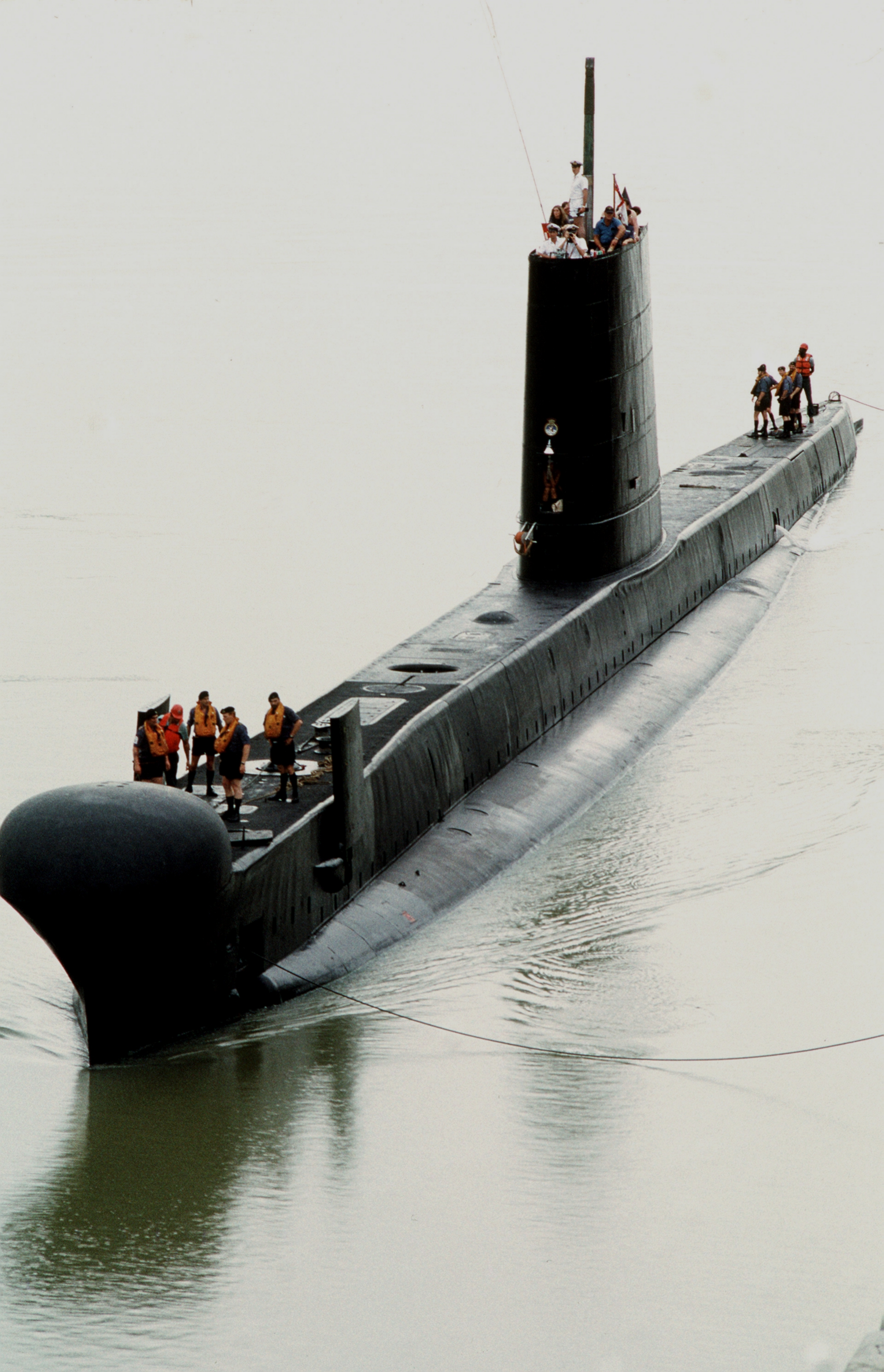
Oberon-class submarine HMS Ocelot underway in 1989

The Oberon class was a ship class of 27 British-designed submarines operated by five different nations. They were designed as a direct follow-on from the Porpoise class: physical dimensions were the same, but stronger materials were used in hull construction, and updated equipment was fitted.

The submarines were built between 1957 and 1978 by four shipyards: Cammell Laird (4), Chatham Dockyard (6), Scotts Shipbuilding and Engineering Company (11) and Vickers-Armstrongs (6). Thirteen of the submarines were operated by the Royal Navy, six by the Royal Australian Navy, three by the Brazilian Navy, three by the Royal Canadian Navy/Canadian Forces Maritime Command (plus two ex-Royal Navy boats later acquired for non-commissioned roles), and two by the Chilean Navy.

The Oberons operated during the height of the Cold War, with duties including surveillance, tracking of other ships and submarines, delivery and retrieval of special forces personnel, and serving as targets for anti-submarine training. Submarines of the class were in service until 2000. As of 2015, eight of the submarines are preserved intact as museum vessels, another three are partially preserved (with some exterior portions of the submarine on display), and one is in private ownership and awaiting conversion for display. The rest have been sold for scrap, including one former museum vessel.

Nation	Name	Pennant (Note: In the Royal Australian Navy, pennant numbers are normally rendered with a space between the letters and numbers, and use an expanded identifier similar to the United States Navy's Hull classification symbol (for example: HMAS Onslow's pennant is "SSG 60"). For this list, the Australian pennant numbers have been rendered in a style similar to the other nations in the list (single-letter flag superior, no space between letter and number))	Builder	Laid down	Launched	Commissioned	Decommissioned	Status/Fate	Notes
United Kingdom	Oberon	S09	Chatham Dockyard	28 November 1957	18 July 1959	24 February 1961	1986	Sold for scrap in 1991	Lead ship of class
United Kingdom	Ocelot	S17	Chatham Dockyard	17 November 1960	5 May 1962	31 January 1964	August 1991	Preserved since 1992 at Chatham Historic Dockyard	
United Kingdom	Odin	S10	Cammell Laird	27 April 1959	4 November 1960	3 May 1962	18 October 1990	Sold for scrap in 1991	
United Kingdom	Olympus	S12	Vickers-Armstrongs	4 March 1960	14 June 1961	7 July 1962	1980s	Sold for scrap in 2011	Operated by Canada from 1989 to the 1990s as a non-commissioned training vessel.
United Kingdom	Onslaught	S14	Chatham Dockyard	8 April 1959	24 September 1960	14 August 1962	1990	Sold for scrap	
United Kingdom	Onyx	S21	Cammell Laird	16 November 1964	18 August 1966	20 November 1967	1991	Sold for scrap in 2014	A previous Oberon named Onyx became the Canadian Ojibwa during construction: this submarine was ordered as a replacement. Preserved from 1991 to 2006 by the Warship Preservation Trust, then from 2006 to 2014 by the Submarine Heritage Centre.
United Kingdom	Opportune	S20	Scotts Shipbuilding	26 October 1962	14 February 1964	29 December 1964	2 June 1993	Sold for scrap	
United Kingdom	Opossum	S19	Cammell Laird	21 December 1961	23 May 1963	5 June 1964	August 1993	Sold for scrap	
United Kingdom	Oracle	S16	Cammell Laird	26 April 1960	26 September 1961	14 February 1963	18 September 1993	Sold for scrap in 1997	
United Kingdom	Orpheus	S11	Vickers-Armstrongs	16 April 1959	17 November 1959	25 November 1960	1987	Sold for scrap in 1994	Between 1987 and 1994 she served as a training vessel at HMS Dolphin.
United Kingdom	Osiris	S13	Vickers-Armstrongs	26 January 1962	29 November 1962	11 January 1964	1989	Sold for scrap in 1991	Between 1988 and 1991, used by Canada as a parts hulk.
United Kingdom	Otter	S15	Scotts Shipbuilding	14 January 1960	15 May 1961	20 August 1962	31 July 1991	Sold for scrap in 1992	
United Kingdom	Otus	S18	Scotts Shipbuilding	31 May 1961	17 October 1962	5 October 1963	1990s	Preserved at Sassnitz, Germany	
Australia	Onslow	S60	Scotts Shipbuilding	4 December 1967	3 December 1968	22 December 1969	30 March 1999	Preserved since 1999 at the Australian National Maritime Museum	
Australia	Orion	S61	Scotts Shipbuilding	6 October 1972	16 September 1974	15 June 1977	1996	Sold for scrap in 2003. Fin preserved at Rockingham Naval Memorial Park.	
Australia	Otama	S62	Scotts Shipbuilding	25 May 1973	3 December 1975	27 April 1978	15 December 2000	Sold for preservation in 2001	
Australia	Otway	S59	Scotts Shipbuilding	29 June 1965	29 November 1966	23 April 1968	17 February 1994	Sold for scrap in 1995. Fin and upper casing preserved at Holbrook, New South Wales	
Australia	Ovens	S70	Scotts Shipbuilding	17 June 1966	4 December 1967	18 April 1969	1 December 1995	Preserved since 1998 at the WA Maritime Museum	
Australia	Oxley	S57	Scotts Shipbuilding	2 July 1964	24 September 1965	21 March 1967	February 1992	Sold for scrap. Fin preserved at HMAS Stirling. Bow preserved at the WA Maritime Museum	
Brazil	Humaitá	S20	Vickers-Armstrongs	3 November 1970	5 October 1971	18 June 1973	1996	?	
Brazil	Tonelero	S21	Vickers-Armstrongs	18 November 1971	22 November 1972	10 December 1977	?	?	
Brazil	Riachuelo	S22	Vickers-Armstrongs	26 May 1973	6 September 1975	March 1977	1997	Preserved at the Navy Cultural Centre, Rio de Janeiro	
Canada	Ojibwa	S72	Chatham Dockyard	27 September 1962	29 February 1964	23 September 1965	21 May 1998	Preserved since 2012 at the Elgin Military Museum	Originally laid down for the Royal Navy as Onyx, sold prior to launching.
Canada	Okanagan	S74	Chatham Dockyard	25 March 1965	17 September 1966	22 June 1968	14 September 1998	Sold for scrap in 2011	
Canada	Onondaga	S73	Chatham Dockyard	18 June 1964	25 September 1965	22 June 1967	28 July 2000	Preserved since 2009 at the Site historique maritime de la Pointe-au-Père	
Chile	O'Brien	S22	Scott Lithgow (Note: Company formed following the 1967 merger of Scotts Shipbuilding and Engineering Company and Lithgows)	17 January 1971	21 December 1972	15 August 1976	?	Preserved in Valdivia, Chile	
Chile	Hyatt	S23	Scott Lithgow	10 January 1972	26 September 1973	27 September 1976	?	Sold for scrap in 2003	

== See also ==
- List of submarines of the Royal Navy
