= Brazilian submarine Humaitá (S20) =

History

Brazil
- Name: Humaita
- Builder: Vickers Shipbuilding and Engineering, Barrow, England
- Laid down: 3 November 1970
- Launched: 5 October 1971
- Commissioned: 18 June 1973
- Decommissioned: 1996

General characteristics
- Class & type: Oberon-class submarine
- Displacement: Surface 2,030 tons, Submerged 2,410 tons
- Length: 295.2 ft (90.0 m)
- Beam: 26.5 ft (8.1 m)
- Draught: 18 ft (5.5 m)
- Propulsion: 2 × Admiralty Standard Range 16 WS – ASR diesels. 3,680 bhp 2 electric generators. 2560 kW. 2 electric motors. 6000 shp. 2 shafts.
- Speed: Surface 12 kn (22 km/h; 14 mph), Submerged 17 kn (31 km/h; 20 mph).
- Range: 9,000 nmi (17,000 km; 10,000 mi) at 12 kn (22 km/h; 14 mph) surfaced.
- Complement: 6 officers, 64 ratings
- Armament: 8 × 21 inch (533 mm) torpedo tubes (6 bow.2 stern).

Brazilian submarine Humaitá (S20) was an Oberon-class submarine in the Brazilian Navy.

== Design and construction ==
The submarine, built by Vickers Shipbuilding and Engineering at their shipyard in Barrow, was laid down on 3 November 1970, and launched on 5 October 1971. She was commissioned into the Brazilian Navy on 18 June 1973.

== Decommissioning and fate ==
Humaitá left naval service in 1996.

== See also ==
- Ships of the Brazilian Navy

== Bibliography ==
- Scheina, Robert L. & Smigielski, Adam (1995). "Brazil". In Chumbley, Stephen (ed.). Conway's All the World's Fighting Ships, 1947–1995 (revised ed.). Naval Institute Press. pp. 29–36. ISBN 1-55750-132-7.
