= HMS Ocelot =

Submarine of the Royal Navy

Coordinates: 51.395502°N 0.526745°E

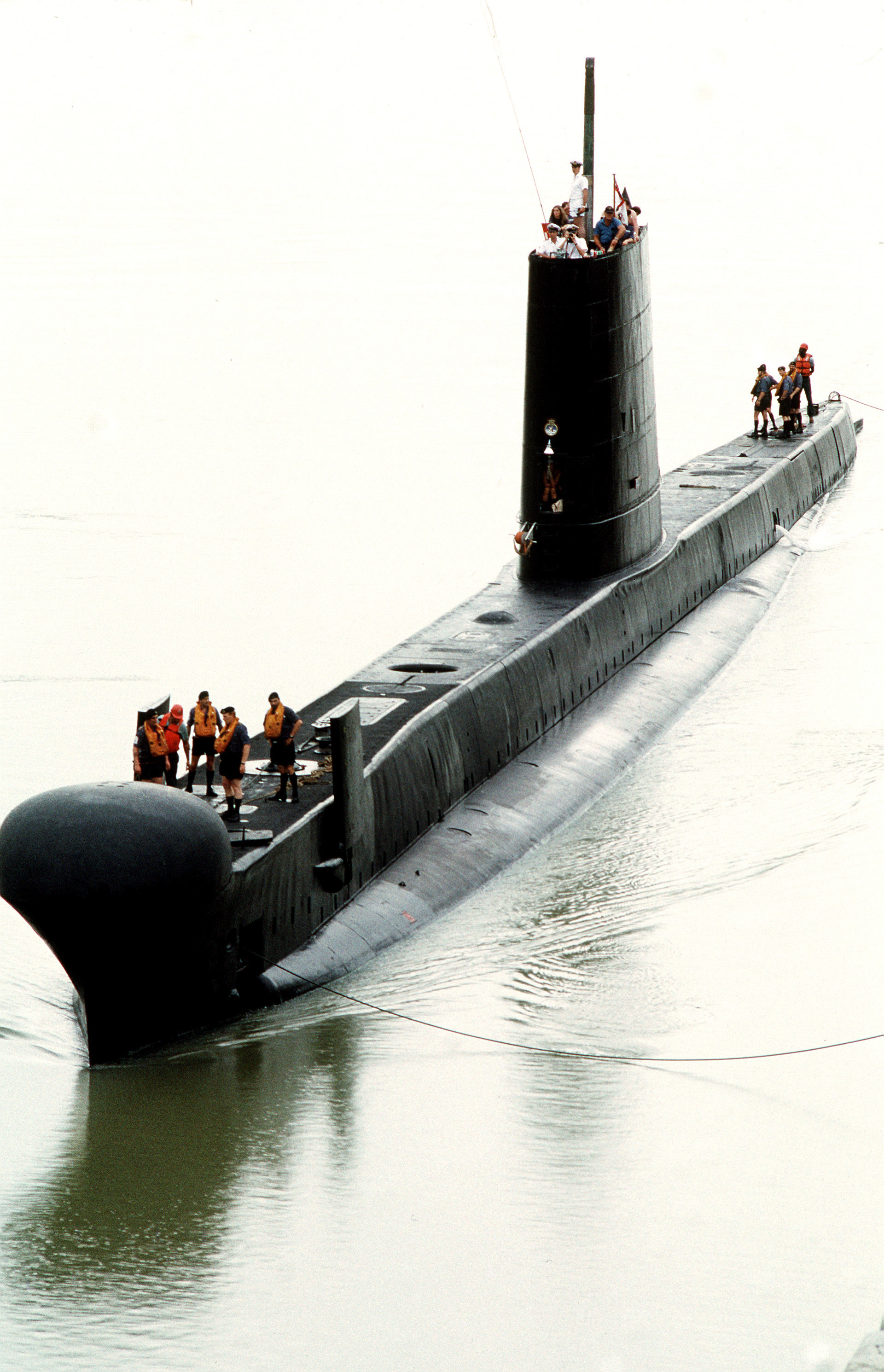
- Ocelot in 1989

History

United Kingdom
- Name: Ocelot
- Builder: Chatham Dockyard
- Laid down: 17 November 1960
- Launched: 5 May 1962
- Commissioned: 31 January 1964
- Decommissioned: August 1991
- Status: Preserved as a museum vessel since 1992

General characteristics as designed
- Class & type: Oberon-class submarine
- Displacement: 1,610 tons standard; 2,030 tons full load surfaced; 2,410 tons full load submerged
- Length: 241 feet (73 m) between perpendiculars; 295.2 feet (90.0 m) length overall
- Beam: 26.5 feet (8.1 m)
- Draught: 18 feet (5.5 m)
- Propulsion: 2 × Admiralty Standard Range 16 VMS diesel generators; 2 × 3,000 shaft horsepower (2,200 kW) electric motors; 2 shafts
- Speed: 17 knots (31 km/h; 20 mph) submerged; 12 knots (22 km/h; 14 mph) surfaced
- Complement: 69
- Sensors & processing systems: Type 186 and Type 187 sonars; I-band surface search radar
- Armament: 8 × 21-inch (530 mm) torpedo tubes (6 forward, 2 aft); 24 torpedoes

HMS Ocelot (S17) is an Oberon-class diesel-electric submarine which was operated by the Royal Navy.

== Design and construction ==
The Oberon class was a direct follow-on of the Porpoise-class, with the same dimensions and external design, but updates to equipment and internal fittings, and a higher grade of steel used for fabrication of the pressure hull.

As designed for British service, the Oberon-class submarines were 241 feet (73 m) in length between perpendiculars and 295.2 feet (90.0 m) in length overall, with a beam of 26.5 feet (8.1 m), and a draught of 18 feet (5.5 m). Displacement was 1,610 tons standard, 2,030 tons full load when surfaced, and 2,410 tons full load when submerged. Propulsion machinery consisted of two Admiralty Standard Range 16 VMS diesel generators, and two 3,000 shaft horsepower (2,200 kW) electric motors, each driving a 7-foot-diameter (2.1 m) three-bladed propeller at up to 400 rpm. Top speed was 17 knots (31 km/h; 20 mph) when submerged, and 12 knots (22 km/h; 14 mph) on the surface. Eight 21-inch-diameter (53 cm) torpedo tubes were fitted (six facing forward, two aft), with a total payload of 24 torpedoes. The boats were fitted with Type 186 and Type 187 sonars, and an I-band surface search radar. The standard complement was 68: 6 officers and 62 sailors.

Ocelot was laid down by Chatham Dockyard on 17 November 1960, and launched on 5 May 1962. The boat was commissioned into the Royal Navy on 31 January 1964. Ocelot was the last submarine built for the Royal Navy at Chatham Dockyard, although three more Oberons; Ojibwa, Onondaga and Okanagan—were built for the Royal Canadian Navy.

== Operational history ==
After commissioning, Ocelot was assigned to the 3rd Submarine Squadron, based at HMNB Clyde, in Faslane, serving there for three years.

During the 1960s, Ocelot took part in clandestine missions. Ocelot attended the 1977 Silver Jubilee Fleet Review off Spithead when she was part of the Submarine Flotilla.

== Decommissioning and fate ==
HMS Ocelot was paid off in August 1991 as the conventional submarine fleet of the RN began to decline, making way for the nuclear fleet. She was sold in 1992 and preserved as a fully tourable museum in Chatham Historic Dockyard.

In November 2013 the interior of HMS Ocelot was added to Google Street View by Google Business Photos Agency, CInsideMedia Ltd.

== Gallery ==
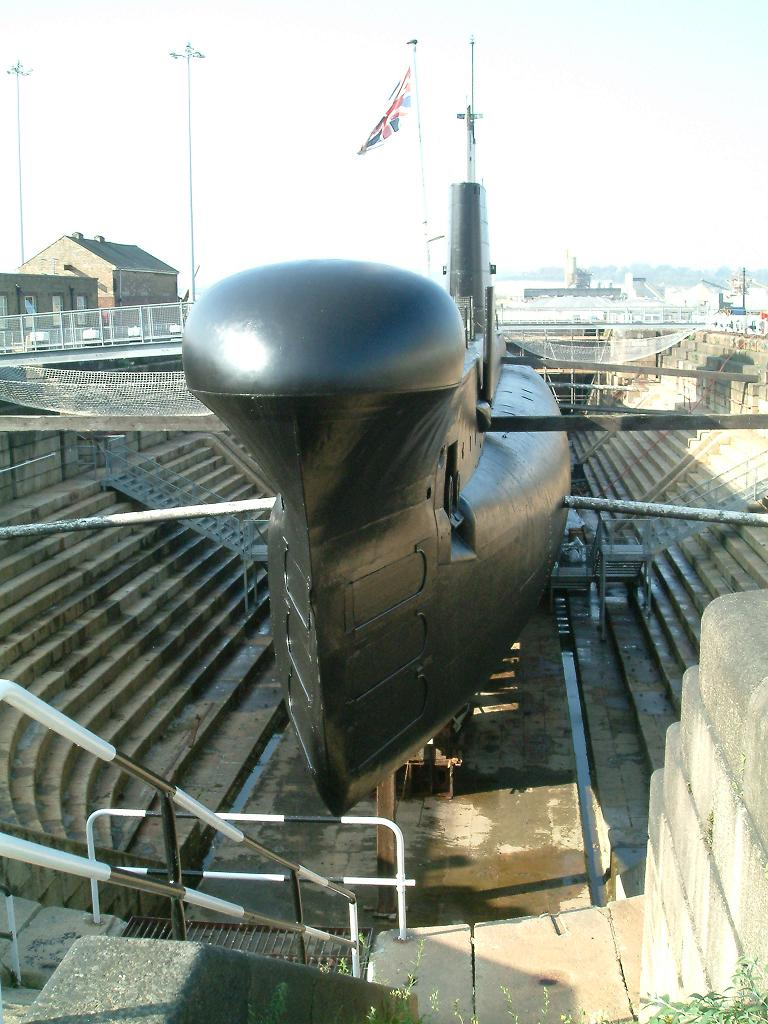
HMS Ocelot in drydock at Chatham Historic Dockyard

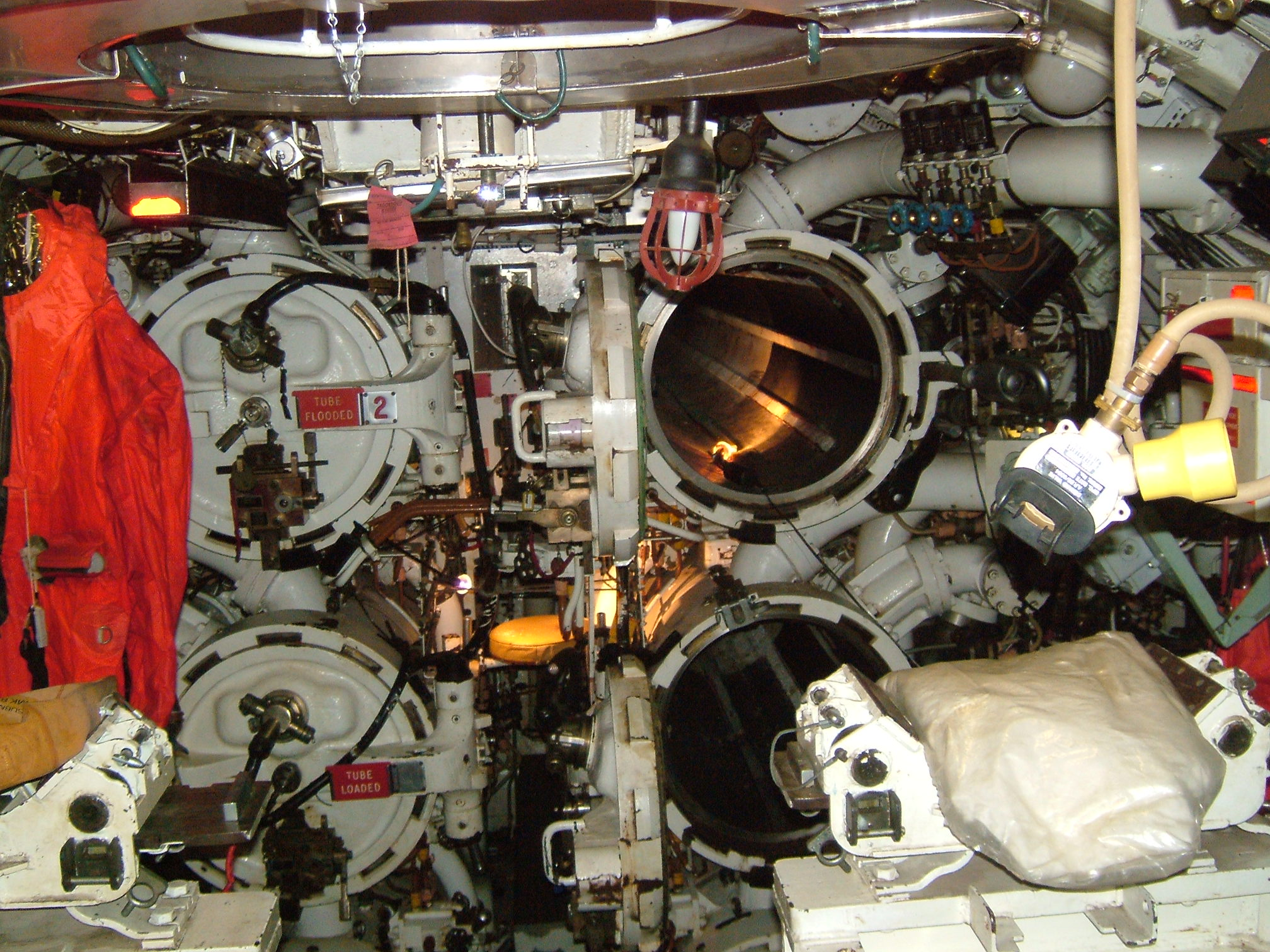
Torpedo tubes and escape hatch.

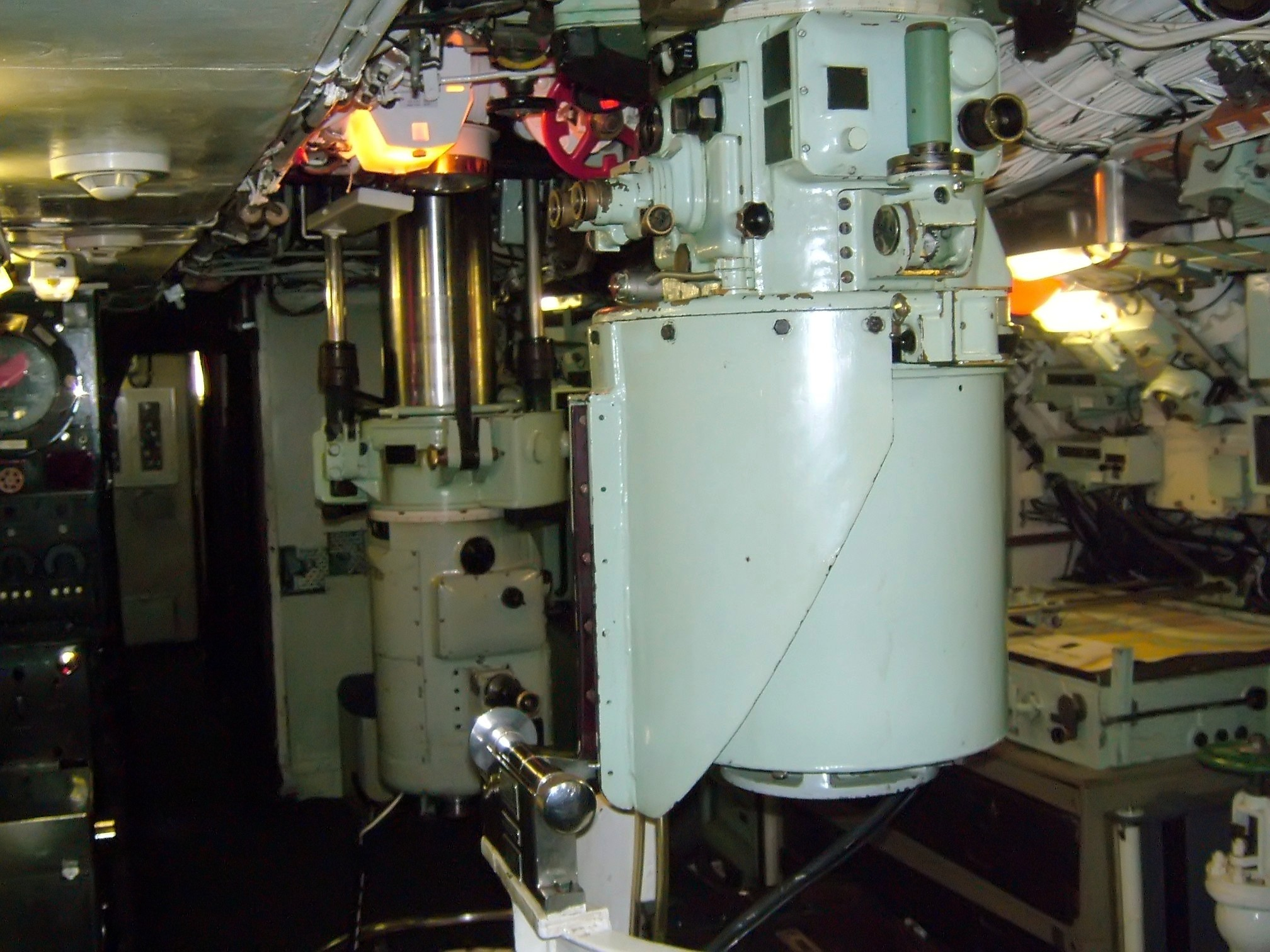
The search periscope and the attack periscope.

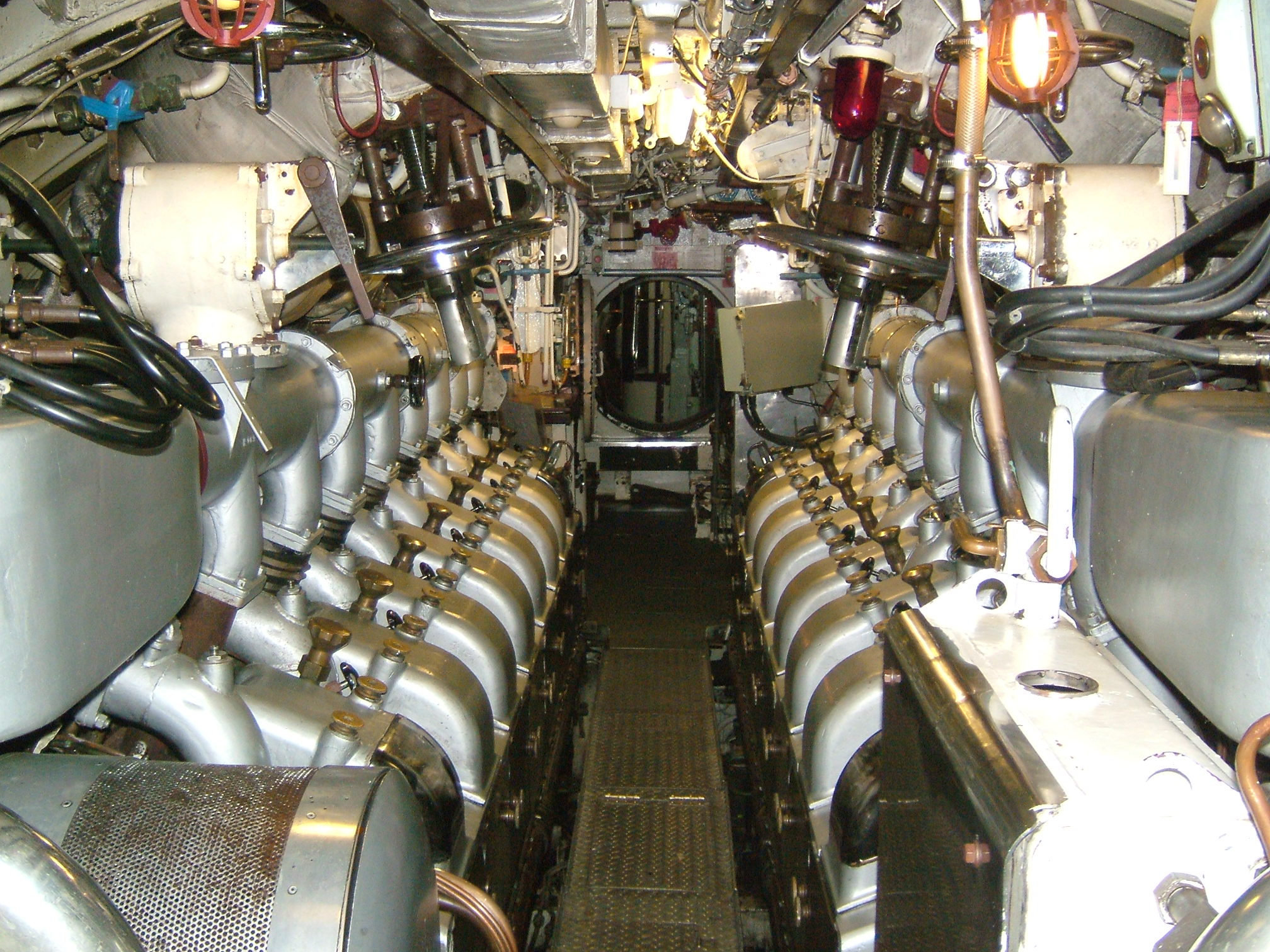
The Diesel Motors charge the batteries so she may travel silently using electric motors.

== Publications ==
- Colledge, J. J.; Warlow, Ben (2006) [1969]. Ships of the Royal Navy: The Complete Record of All Fighting Ships of the Royal Navy from the 15th Century to the Present (3rd Rev ed.). London: Chatham Publishing. ISBN 978-1-86176-281-8. OCLC 67375475.
