= Brazilian submarine Riachuelo (S22) =

Brazilian Navy submarine

Coordinates: 22°54′1.5″S 43°10′28.5″W

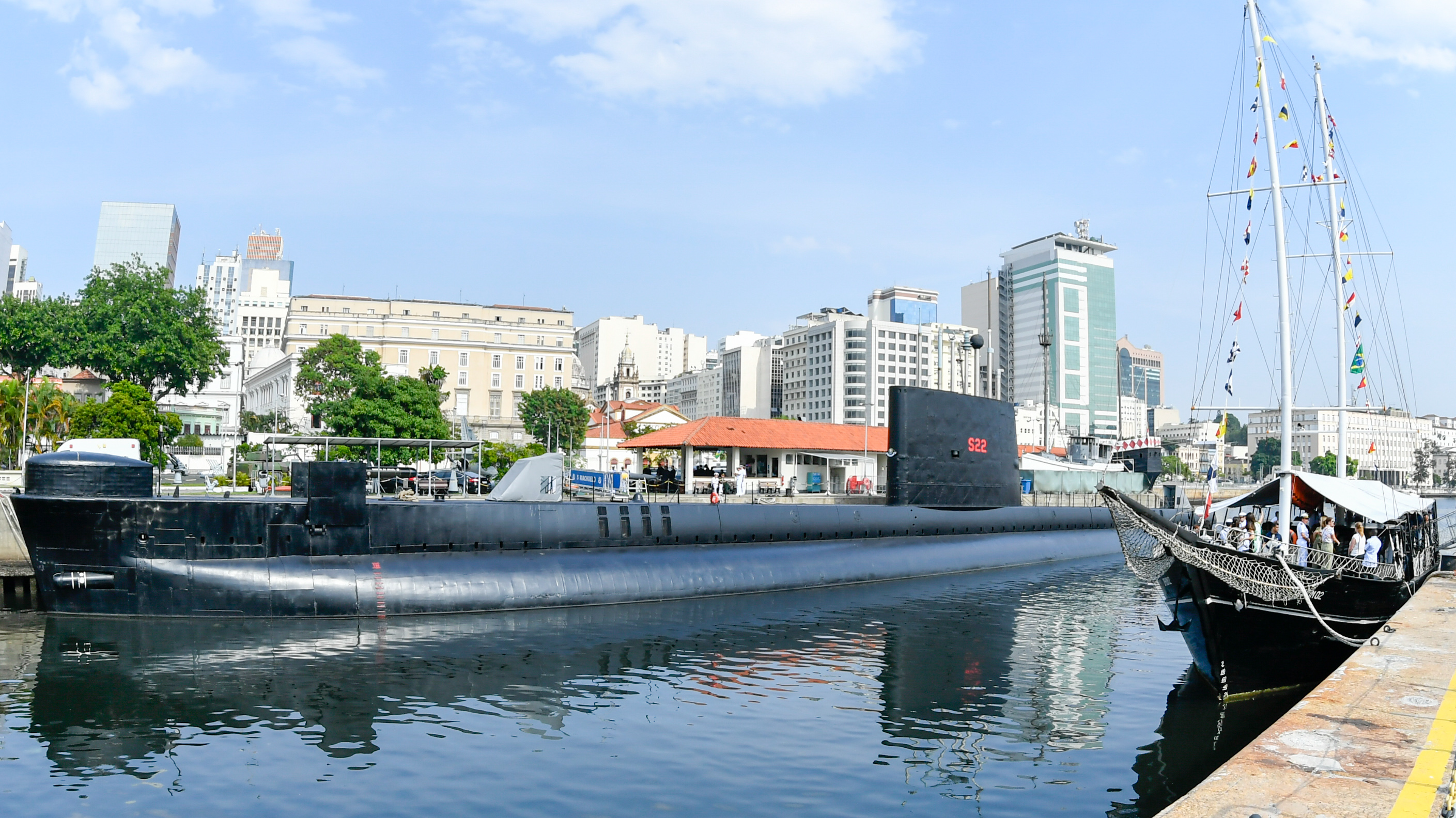
- Riachuelo (S22)

History

Brazil
- Name: Riachuelo
- Namesake: Battle of the Riachuelo
- Ordered: 1972
- Builder: Vickers Shipbuilding and Engineering, Barrow, England
- Launched: 6 September 1975
- Commissioned: March 1977
- Decommissioned: 1997
- Status: Museum ship

General characteristics
- Class & type: Oberon-class submarine
- Displacement: Surfaced 2,030 tons; Submerged 2,410 tons
- Length: 295.2 ft (90.0 m)
- Beam: 26.5 ft (8.1 m)
- Draught: 18 ft (5.5 m)
- Propulsion: 2 × Admiralty Standard Range 16WS – ASR diesels. 3,680 bhp (2,740 kW); 2 electric generators. 2560 kW. 2 electric motors. 6,000 shp (4,500 kW). 2 shafts
- Speed: Surface 12 knots (22 km/h; 14 mph); Submerged 17 kn (31 km/h; 20 mph)
- Range: 9,000 nmi (17,000 km; 10,000 mi) at 12 kn (22 km/h; 14 mph) surfaced
- Complement: 6 officers, 64 ratings
- Armament: 8 × 21 in (533 mm) torpedo tubes (6 bow, 2 stern)
- Notes: given a mid-life modernisation in 1995 by the company HDW/FERROSTAL

Riachuelo (S22) was an Oberon-class submarine in the Brazilian Navy.

== Design and construction ==
Riachuelo was ordered in 1972, separately from her two sister boats. The submarine, built by Vickers Shipbuilding and Engineering at their shipyard in Barrow, was laid down on 26 May 1973, and launched on 6 September 1975. She was commissioned into the Brazilian Navy in early 1977.

== Operational history ==
Riachuelo participated in the multiple exercices with the US Navy and the Uruguayan Navy in the 1970's.

Riachuelo received the "Efficiency Trophy" in the year that this award was instituted by the Submarine Force Command.

After about two decades of operations, it was discharged from active service on November 12, 1997. It sailed more than 181 thousand nautical miles, in 1,283.5 days at sea and 17,699 hours and forty-one minutes of immersion.

== Decommissioning and fate ==
Riachuelo was decommissioned in 1997. She is now displayed at the Navy Cultural Centre in Rio de Janeiro.

== Bibliography ==
- Scheina, Robert L. & Smigielski, Adam (1995). "Brazil". In Chumbley, Stephen (ed.). Conway's All the World's Fighting Ships, 1947–1995 (revised ed.). Naval Institute Press. pp. 29–36. ISBN 1-55750-132-7.
