= HMAS Oxley (S 57) =

1967–1992 Oberon-class submarine of the Royal Australian Navy

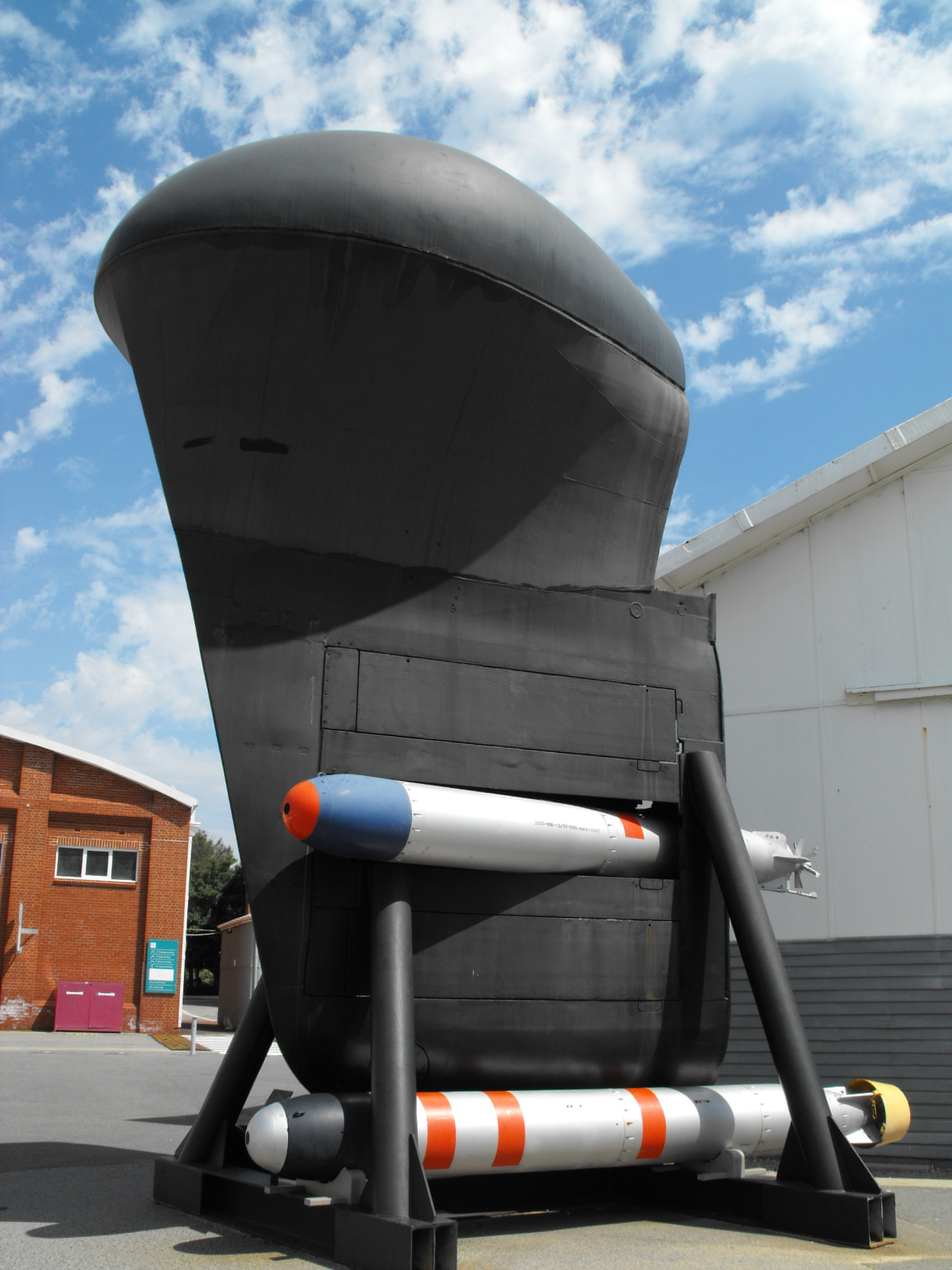
- The bow section of HMAS Oxley, on display outside the Western Australian Maritime Museum

History

Australia
- Builder: Scotts Shipbuilding and Engineering Company
- Laid down: 2 July 1964
- Launched: 24 September 1965
- Commissioned: 21 March 1967
- Decommissioned: February 1992
- Motto: "Patience And Strength"
- Fate: Sold for scrap
- Badge

General characteristics
- Class & type: Oberon-class submarine
- Displacement: 1,610 tons standard; 2,030 tons surfaced; 2,410 tons submerged
- Length: 295.2 ft (90.0 m)
- Beam: 26.5 ft (8.1 m)
- Draught: 18 ft (5.5 m)
- Propulsion: 2 × Admiralty Standard Range supercharged V16 diesel generators; 2 × English Electric motors; 3,500 bhp, 4,500 shp; 2 shafts
- Speed: 12 knots (22 km/h; 14 mph) surfaced; 17 knots (31 km/h; 20 mph) submerged; 11 knots (20 km/h; 13 mph) at snorkel depth
- Range: 9,000 nautical miles (17,000 km; 10,000 mi) at 12 knots (22 km/h; 14 mph)
- Test depth: 200 metres (660 ft)
- Complement: As launched: 8 officers, 56 sailors; At decommissioning: 8 officers, 60 sailors
- Sensors & processing systems: Sonar: Atlas Elektronik Type CSU3-41 bow array; BAC Type 2007 flank array; Sperry BQG-4 Micropuffs rangefinding array; Radar: Kelvin Hughes Type 1006
- Armament: Torpedo tubes: 6 × 21-inch (53 cm) bow tubes; 2 × short-length 21-inch (53 cm) stern tubes (later removed); 1996 payload: Mix of 20: Mark 48 Mod 4 torpedoes; UGM-84 Sub Harpoon missiles

HMAS Oxley (S 57) was an Oberon-class submarine of the Royal Australian Navy (RAN).

== Design and construction ==
The Oberon class was based heavily on the preceding Porpoise class of submarines, with changes made to improve the vessels' hull integrity, sensor systems, and stealth capabilities. Eight submarines were ordered for the RAN, in two batches of four. The first batch (including Oxley) was approved in 1963, and the second batch was approved during the late 1960s, although two of these were cancelled before construction started in 1969, with the funding redirected to the Fleet Air Arm. This was the fourth time the RAN had attempted to establish a submarine branch.

The submarine was 295.2 feet (90.0 m) long, with a beam of 26.5 feet (8.1 m), and a draught of 18 feet (5.5 m) when surfaced. At full load displacement, she displaced 2,030 tons when surfaced, and 2,410 tons when submerged. The two propeller shafts were each driven by an English Electric motor providing 3,500 brake horsepower and 4,500 shaft horsepower; the electricity for these was generated by two Admiralty Standard Range supercharged V16 diesel generators. The submarine could travel at up to 12 knots (22 km/h; 14 mph) on the surface, and up to 17 knots (31 km/h; 20 mph) when submerged, had a maximum range of 9,000 nautical miles (17,000 km; 10,000 mi) at 12 knots (22 km/h; 14 mph), and a test depth of 200 metres (660 ft) below sea level. When launched, the boat had a company of 8 officers and 56 sailors, but by the time she decommissioned, the number of sailors had increased to 60. In addition, up to 16 trainees could be carried.

The main armament of the Oberons consisted of six 21-inch (533.4 mm) torpedo tubes. The British Mark 8 torpedo was initially carried by the submarine; this was later replaced by the wire-guided Mark 23. During the 1980s, the Australian Oberons were upgraded to carry United States Navy Mark 48 torpedoes and UGM-84 Sub Harpoon anti-ship missiles. As of 1996, the standard payload of an Australian Oberon was a mix of 20 Mark 48 Mod 4 torpedoes and Sub Harpoon missiles. Some or all of the torpedo payload could be replaced by Mark 5 Stonefish sea mines, which were deployed through the torpedo tubes. On entering service, two stern-mounted, short-length 21-inch (53 cm) torpedo tubes for Mark 20 anti-submarine torpedoes. However, the development of steerable wire-guided torpedoes made the less-capable aft-firing torpedoes redundant; they were closed off, and later removed during a refit.

Oxley was laid down by Scotts Shipbuilding and Engineering Company at Greenock, Scotland on 2 July 1964, launched on 24 September 1965, and commissioned into the RAN on 21 March 1967.

== Operational history ==
After completing sea trials, Oxley sailed to Sydney via the Panama Canal. The submarine arrived on 18 August 1967, the same day as the submarine base Platypus was commissioned and the Australian Submarine Squadron replaced the British 4th Submarine Squadron.

In October 1977, Oxley docked at Cockatoo Island Dockyard for the Submarine Weapon Update Program, a major overhaul of the Australian Oberons' warfighting capability. The upgrade was completed in February 1980.

== Decommissioning and fate ==
Oxley paid off on 13 February 1992 and was scrapped. Her fin is on display outside the Submarine Training and Systems Centre at HMAS Stirling and her bow is preserved at the Western Australian Maritime Museum in Fremantle. An anchor forms part of a Submariners Memorial at HMAS Platypus, dedicated on 18 August 2017, on the 50th anniversary of the boat's arrival in Sydney Harbour.
