= HMS Otus (S18) =

Submarine of the Royal Navy

Coordinates: 54°30′43″N 13°38′31″E

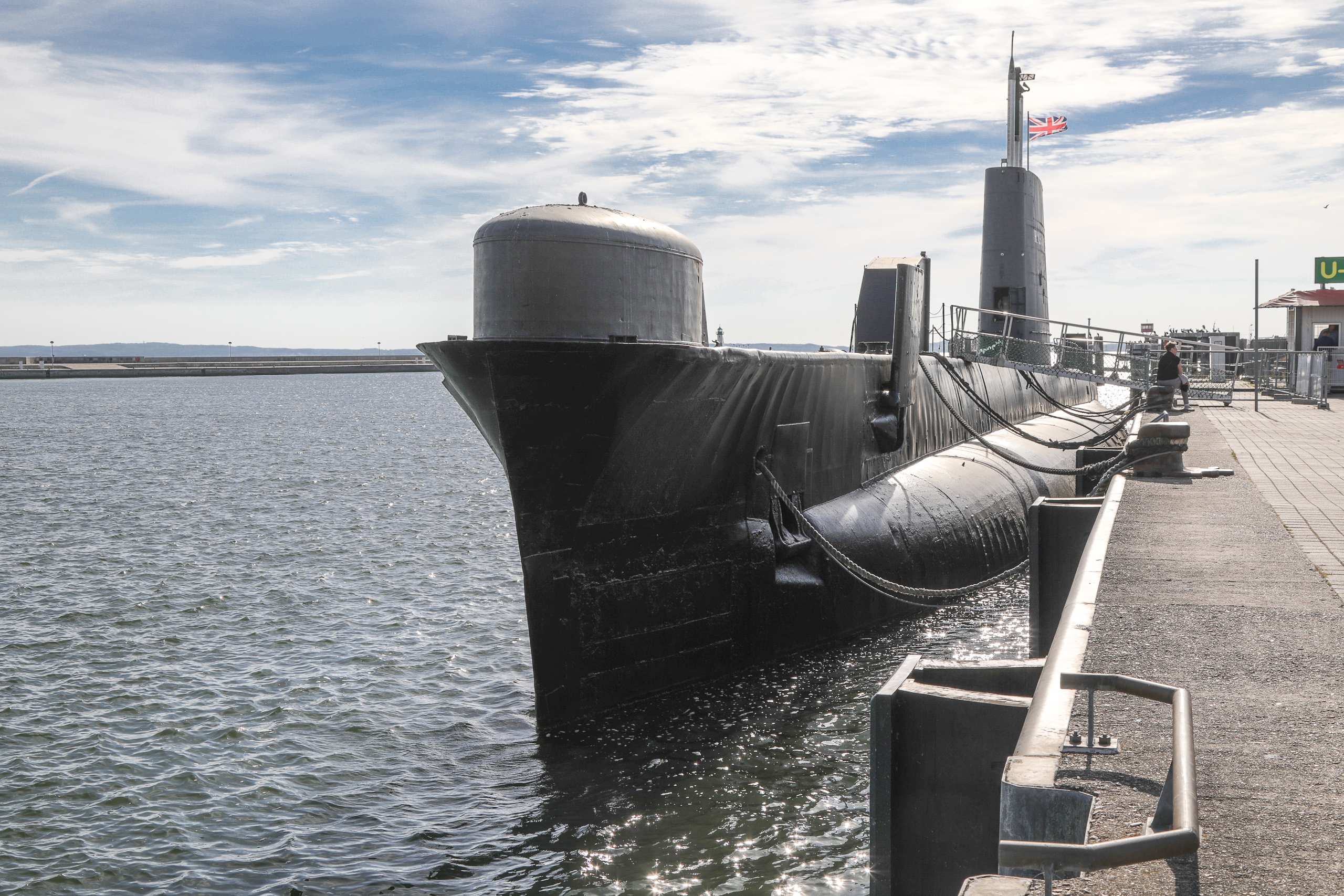
- HMS Otus

History

United Kingdom
- Name: HMS Otus
- Builder: Scotts Yard in Greenock, Scotland
- Yard number: 688
- Laid down: 31 May 1961
- Launched: 17 October 1962
- Commissioned: 5 October 1963
- Decommissioned: April 1991
- Identification: Pennant number: S18
- Status: Museum ship in Sassnitz, Germany

General characteristics as designed
- Class & type: Oberon-class submarine
- Displacement: 1,610 tons standard; 2,030 tons full load surfaced; 2,410 tons full load submerged
- Length: 241 feet (73 m) between perpendiculars; 295.2 feet (90.0 m) length overall
- Beam: 26.5 feet (8.1 m)
- Draught: 18 feet (5.5 m)
- Propulsion: 2 × Admiralty Standard Range 16 VTS diesel generators; 2 × 3,000 shaft horsepower (2,200 kW) electric motors; 2 shafts
- Speed: 17 knots (31 km/h; 20 mph) submerged; 12 knots (22 km/h; 14 mph) surfaced
- Complement: 68
- Sensors & processing systems: Type 186 and Type 187 sonars; I-band surface search radar
- Armament: 8 × 21-inch (530 mm) torpedo tubes (6 forward, 2 aft); 24 torpedoes

HMS Otus was a Royal Navy Oberon-class submarine launched in 1962. She was decommissioned in the early 1990s and is now a museum ship in Germany.

== Design and construction ==
The Oberon class was a direct follow on of the Porpoise class, with the same dimensions and external design, but updates to equipment and internal fittings, and a higher grade of steel used for fabrication of the pressure hull.

As designed for British service, the Oberon-class submarines were 241 feet (73 m) in length between perpendiculars and 295.2 feet (90.0 m) in length overall, with a beam of 26.5 feet (8.1 m), and a draught of 18 feet (5.5 m). Displacement was 1,610 tons standard, 2,030 tons full load when surfaced, and 2,410 tons full load when submerged. Propulsion machinery consisted of 2 Admiralty Standard Range 16 VTS diesel generators, and two 3,000-shaft-horsepower (2,200 kW) electric motors, each driving a 7-foot diameter (2.1 m) 3-bladed propeller at up to 400 rpm. Top speed was 17 knots (31 km/h; 20 mph) when submerged, and 12 knots (22 km/h; 14 mph) on the surface. Eight 21-inch (530 mm) diameter torpedo tubes were fitted (six facing forward, two aft), with a total payload of 24 torpedoes. The boats were fitted with Type 186 and Type 187 sonars, and an I-band surface search radar. The standard complement was 68: 6 officers, 62 sailors.

Otus was laid down by Scotts Shipbuilding and Engineering Company on 31 May 1961, and launched on 17 October 1962. Sea trials were undertaken in Scottish waters, mainly Loch Long and Loch Fyne. The boat was commissioned into the Royal Navy on 5 October 1963.

== Operational history ==
The first commission of Otus included large-scale missile trial exercises in the Atlantic Ocean and visits to the United States and Halifax, Nova Scotia, Canada.

Otus attended the 1977 Silver Jubilee Fleet Review off Spithead when she was part of the Submarine Flotilla.

In July 1987, a team of British, Commonwealth and international submariners took part in trials in Bjornafjorden, near Bergen, Norway, aboard Otus. They ran a series of progressively deeper escapes, starting at 30 metres (98 ft). At 90 metres (300 ft), individuals started to drop out. At the end of the trials two submariners reached a depth of 183 metres (600 ft). This set a new world record which to date has not been broken. Of the two record breakers, the first (WO. Norman Cook MBE, the commander of the Submarine Escape Training Tower at HMS Dolphin) was a regular ascent under control. The second, a petty officer instructor (PO. Hamish Jones BEM) from the Submarine Escape Training Tower, suffered an emergency release having given the alarm signal whilst flooding up the chamber. It was considered safer and quicker to escape him rather than depressurise and drain down. Both escapees suffered no lasting effects and returned to normal service. Both received military honours of the British Empire in the following years for this act.

Otus was deployed to the Persian Gulf during the 1991 Gulf War under Operation Granby. On her return to Gosport, she was flying a Jolly Roger; the only indication that the submarine had been involved in deploying and recovering Special Air Service and Special Boat Service personnel.

== Decommissioning and museum ==
Otus was decommissioned in April 1991 and sold to Pound's scrapyard in Portsmouth in 1992. In June 2002 she was purchased by a German entrepreneur, who moored her in Sassnitz harbour on the island of Rügen in Germany as a floating museum ship.
