= HMCS Ojibwa =

1964 Oberon-class submarine

Coordinates: 42.646857°N 80.807680°W

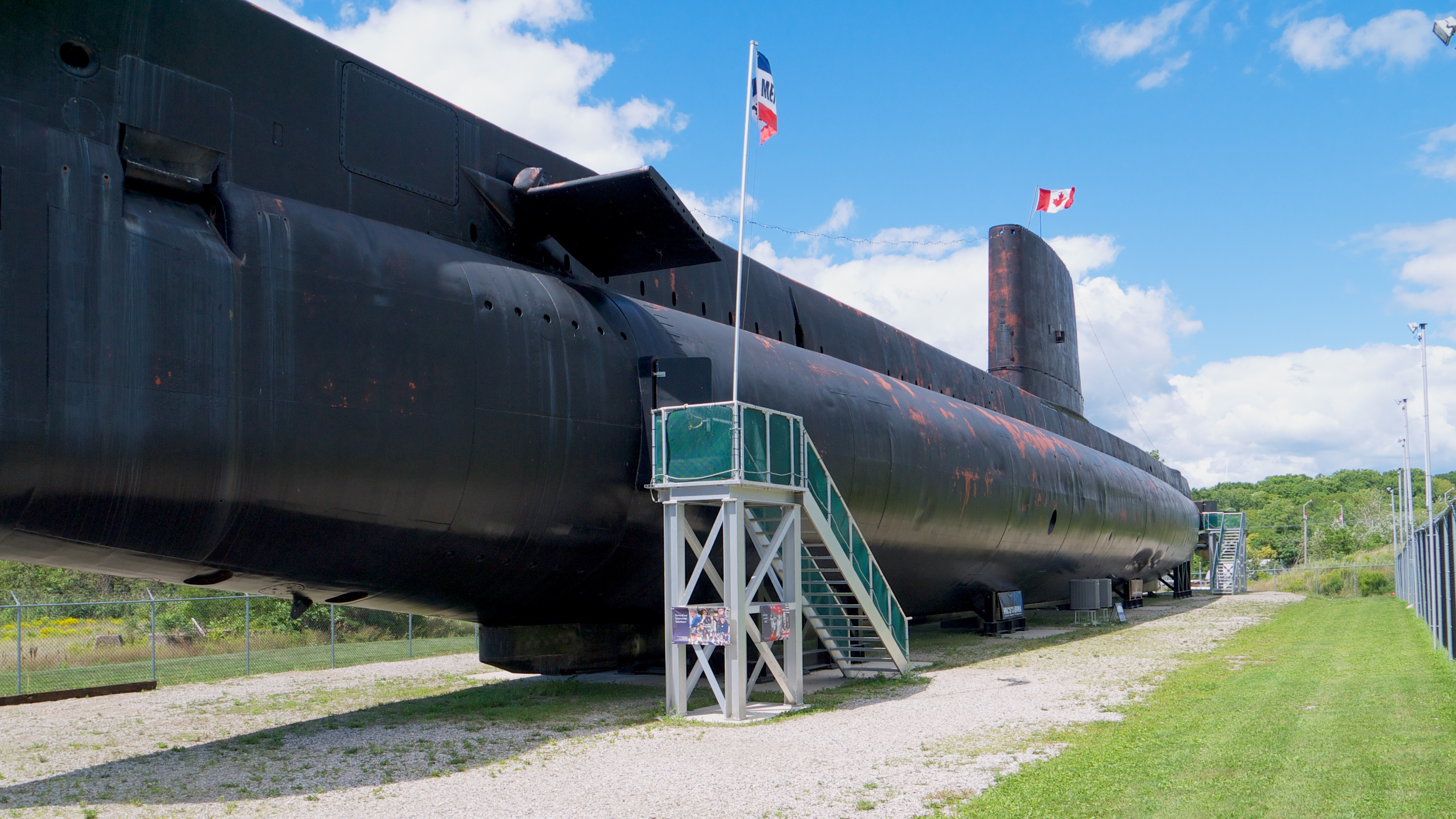
- HMCS Ojibwa as museum vessel in Port Burwell, Ontario.

History

United Kingdom
- Name: Onyx
- Builder: Chatham Dockyard, Chatham
- Laid down: 27 September 1962
- Fate: Sold to Canada while under construction

Canada
- Name: Ojibwa
- Namesake: Ojibwa First Nations people
- Launched: 29 February 1964
- Acquired: 1963
- Commissioned: 23 September 1965
- Decommissioned: May 1998
- Identification: S 72
- Motto: Ne ke che dah; ("Let us be prepared")
- Fate: Transferred to Elgin Military Museum 2 December 2011
- Status: Museum ship at Port Burwell, Ontario since 2013
- Badge: Blazon Azure, an escallop shell erect argent irradiated by nine ears of wild rice or, all issuing from two barrulets wavy of the last, in base.

General characteristics
- Class & type: Oberon-class submarine
- Displacement: Surfaced: 2,030 t (2,000 long tons); Submerged: 2,410 t (2,370 long tons)
- Length: 295.25 ft (89.99 m)
- Beam: 26.5 ft (8.1 m)
- Draught: 18 ft (5.5 m)
- Propulsion: 2-shaft diesel/electric; 2 x ASR 1 16-cylinder diesel engines, 3,680 bhp (2,740 kW); 2 x English Electric motors, 6,000 shp (4,500 kW)
- Speed: Surfaced: 12 kn (22 km/h; 14 mph); Submerged: 17.5 kn (32.4 km/h; 20.1 mph)
- Range: 9,000 nautical miles (17,000 km; 10,000 mi) at 12 kn (22 km/h; 14 mph)
- Endurance: 258 t of oil, 56 days
- Test depth: 120 metres (390 ft)-180 metres (590 ft)
- Complement: 69
- Sensors & processing systems: Type 187 Active-Passive sonar; Type 2007 passive sonar; Type 2019 sonar
- Electronic warfare & decoys: MEL Manta UAL or UA4 radar warning
- Armament: 8 × 21 in (533 mm) tubes (6 bow, 2 stern), 30 torpedoes

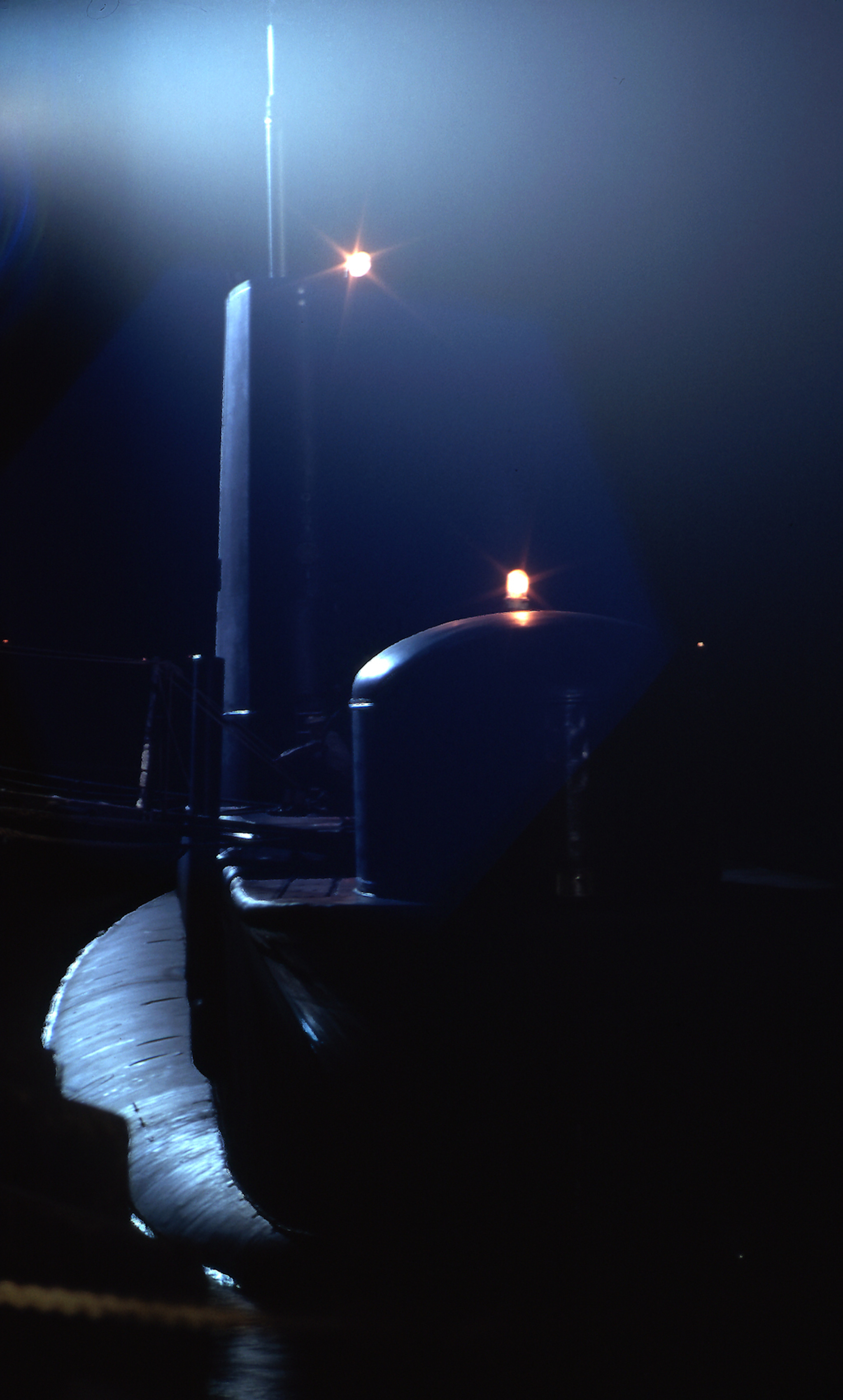
A Canadian Oberon-class submarine alongside in Roosey Roads for Operation Springboard, January 1969

HMCS Ojibwa is an Oberon-class submarine that served in the Royal Canadian Navy (RCN) and later the Canadian Forces Maritime Command (MARCOM). Originally intended for service with the British Royal Navy as HMS Onyx, the submarine was transferred to Canadian ownership before completion, and entered RCN service in 1965. Ojibwa operated primarily with Maritime Forces Atlantic until her decommissioning in 1998. In 2010, Ojibwa was laid up at CFB Halifax awaiting disposal, with the Elgin Military Museum planning to preserve her as a museum vessel. The submarine was towed to Port Burwell, Ontario in 2012, and was opened to the public in 2013. She is now the new focal point of a planned Museum of Naval History to be built alongside.

== Design ==
The Oberon class were considered an improved version of the preceding Porpoise-class submarines, with a different frame of the pressure hull and constructed from a better grade of steel. These build differences allowed the Oberons to have a deeper diving depth at roughly 1,000 feet (300 m).

The submarines displaced 2,030 tonnes (2,000 long tons) surfaced and 2,410 tonnes (2,370 long tons) submerged. They measured 295 ft 1/4 in (89.922 m) long with a beam of 26 ft 1/2 in (7.938 m) and a draught of 18 ft (5.5 m). (Note: Gardiner and Chumbley state that the dimensions were 241 ft (73 m) between perpendiculars, 290 ft 3 in (88.47 m) long overall with a beam of 26 ft 6 in (8.08 m) and a draught of 18 ft 3 in (5.56 m))

The boats were powered by a two shaft diesel-electric system. The Oberons were equipped with two ASR 1 16-cylinder diesel engines creating 3,680 brake horsepower (2,740 kW) and two English Electric motors creating 6,000 shaft horsepower (4,500 kW). This gave the submarines a maximum surface speed of 12 knots (22 km/h; 14 mph) and a submerged speed of 17 knots (31 km/h; 20 mph). The boats carried 258 tons of oil giving them a range of 9,000 nautical miles (17,000 km; 10,000 mi) at 12 knots.

The design was armed with eight 21-inch (533 mm) torpedo tubes, six in the bow and two in the stern. They carried 24 reloads for a total of 30 torpedoes. Canadian boats differed from the original design by being equipped for the US Mark 37C torpedo. The longer, wire-guided Mod 2 version was carried in the forward tubes and the non-guided Mod 0 for the rear tubes.

The Oberons were equipped with Type 187 active-passive sonar, Type 2007 passive sonar and Type 2019 sonar.

=== Submarine Operational Update Program (SOUP) ===
By the late 1970s, the Oberons in Canadian service had become obsolete and were in need of an update. Planning was done in 1978 and the program approved in February 1979. In an effort to take the subs from anti-submarine warfare training to frontline service, Maritime Command developed a refit program that included new sonars, periscopes, communications and fire-control systems. They also had their armament upgraded with the fitting of torpedo tubes capable of firing the Mark 48 torpedo. This would allow the submarines to be deployed by NATO in the North Atlantic to monitor Soviet submarines.

The SOUP refits comprised a new US fire control system, a digital Singer Librascope Mark I, and new Sperry passive ranging sonar with the Type 719 short range sonar removed. The new sonar was placed in the upper casing on the pressure hull. New communications and navigational systems were installed. The submarines were fitted with new torpedo tubes for Mark 48 torpedoes, however the torpedoes themselves were considered a separate procurement program, which was only finalized in 1985.

Between 1980 and 1986, one of the Canadian Oberons was out of service undergoing the refit. SOUP came in on time and on its budget of C$45 million in 1986. SOUP kept the Canadian Oberons operational until the end of the 1990s when they were replaced by the British Upholder-class submarines.

== Acquisition ==
In March 1962, the Cabinet recommended the purchase of three Oberons and eight frigates, on the condition that the cost of acquiring the submarines from the United Kingdom would be offset by British defence purchases in Canada. On 11 April 1962, the purchase was announced in the House of Commons of Canada by the Minister of National Defence, Douglas Harkness.

However, the Conservative government postponed the acquisition of the Oberons due to the slow speed of the United Kingdom's attempt to offset the acquisition. The Conservative government was defeated in 1963 and the incoming Liberal government suspended all major defence procurement projects upon taking power. The United Kingdom, in an effort to get the contract moving, offered the hulls of Ocelot and Opportune, but Canada passed on them. However, when Onyx became available, Canada took up the offer. The final price of C$40 million for the entire contract was agreed upon in 1963. However, due to Canadian modifications to the design, that number climbed to C$51.4 million.

Since Onyx was already under construction, the boat was finished to Royal Navy specifications. All three boats received modifications to the original Oberon design, which included the enlargement of the snort de-icer, a different weapons fit, a larger air conditioning unit, active sonar and different communications equipment. The second and third hulls were built to Canadian specifications, which moved the galley forward of the control room to make room for the sonar equipment. This led to the removal of three crew bunks, a problem that was never rectified in the submarines and led to an accommodation issue for the crew. The three submarines were acquired for service as "clockwork mice", submarines used to train surface vessels in anti-submarine warfare.

== Construction and career ==
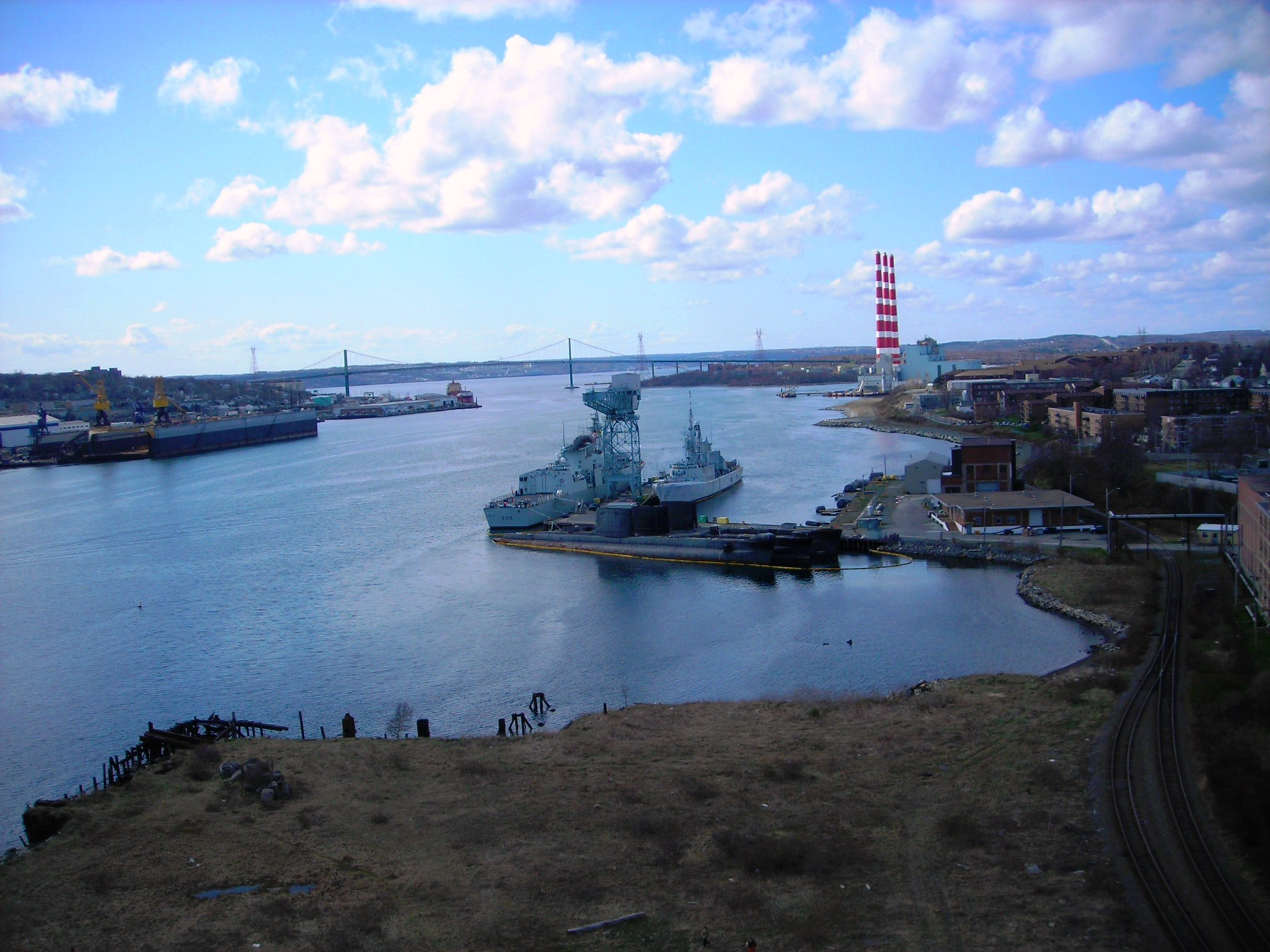
HMCS Ojibwa, HMCS Okanagan and ex-HMS Olympus docked in Halifax

The submarine was initially ordered for the Royal Navy as HMS Onyx, with Chatham Dockyard laying the keel down on 27 September 1962. In 1963 the submarine was transferred to the Royal Canadian Navy, and was launched as HMCS Ojibwa on 29 February 1964. Ojibwa was commissioned on 23 September 1965 at Chatham Dockyard. The submarine was named after the Ojibwe First Nations people, and was assigned the pennant number S 72.

Ojibwa was assigned to the First Canadian Submarine Squadron on 22 April 1966, later joined by her sister boats and served virtually her entire career with Maritime Forces Atlantic (MARLANT) in the North Atlantic. Following the establishment of the First Canadian Submarine Squadron, personnel issues arose aboard Ojibwa and Rear-Admiral William Landymore was forced to intervene directly, relieving the commander of the submarine, Lt. Commander Samuel G. Tomlinson. Ojibwa spent time training with the Royal Navy after an exchange program was instituted in the 1960s that would see submarines from both the Royal Navy and Royal Canadian Navy spend time with each other's forces. This allowed Canadian submarines on intelligence-gathering missions. Beginning in the 1970s, Canada began underwater surveillance patrols in the western Atlantic, tracking Soviet sub and surface fleet vessels, especially the ballistic missile submarines, usually in concert with an Argus or Aurora patrol aircraft. In 1977, Ojibwa made a short deployment to British Columbia with Maritime Forces Pacific (MARPAC) in 1977. She took part in WESTEX 77, a training exercise off the west coast.

Ojibwa underwent her SOUP refit beginning in 1979, arriving at HMC Dockyard at Halifax, Nova Scotia on 18 June for preparation. The refit began on 20 February 1981 and lasted until 31 May 1982. Following the SOUP refit and the introduction of the Mark 48 torpedoes, the Oberons were considered fully operational and counted the same as other offensive fleet units in Maritime Command. From 14 November to 6 December 1983, Ojibwa performed and anti-Soviet submarine patrol for NATO. The sub made another patrol in March 1985 and discovered a Soviet Delta-class submarine. The Delta-class sub passed within 800 yards (730 m) of Ojibwa, which tracked the Soviets for two days. On 20 March, Ojibwa was detected by a Soviet Victor-class submarine and broke off contact with both subs.

Following the end of the Cold War, the Oberons were retasked, performing patrols on behalf of federal institutions such as the Department of Fisheries and Oceans and the Solicitor General of Canada between 1991 and 1994. For six months in 1994, the submarine served on the west coast. The delay of the introduction of the Victoria-class submarines led to the Oberons working past their life expectancy. In 1994, Ojibwa was cut in half; her engines were removed and replaced with newer ones from HMS Osiris, which had been purchased from the Royal Navy as a source of spare parts in 1992. During the Turbot War, the Oberons were tasked with monitoring European fishing fleets off the Grand Banks of Newfoundland. Their presence served as a deterrent in the escalating crisis. In 1997 Ojibwa made a second small deployment to the west coast. This deployment was rife with problems, as the submarine developed mechanical and technical difficulties. She was paid off from MARCOM on 21 May 1998.

== Museum ship ==
In May 2005, the Halifax Chronicle-Herald announced that MARCOM was looking to sell Ojibwa for scrap metal, along with three other Canadian Oberons. MARCOM stated that the submarines were not in suitable condition to be used as museum ships and predicted that each submarine would sell for between C$50,000 and C$60,000. After decommissioning, she was a target in "shock" testing in 2010 resulting in a noticeable dent on the port side.

On 11 June 2010, it was reported that Ojibwa would be moved by BMT Fleet Technology Ltd to become part of the collection of the Elgin Military Museum at St. Thomas, Ontario. On 2 December 2011, it was announced that the Department of National Defence had approved the transfer of Ojibwa to the Elgin Military Museum subject to satisfaction of financial requirements. The final agreement was signed on 25 May 2012 after three years of negotiations.

On 26 May 2012, Ojibwa started her trip from Halifax, Nova Scotia to Hamilton, Ontario by way of the St. Lawrence Seaway. The submarine was transferred with the help of the tugs Florence M and Lac Manitoba and tow HM-1. She stayed in Hamilton at Heddle Marine Dockyards being repainted and fitted with specialized transport cradles that would allow her to be moved across land. On 18 November 2012, Ojibwa, on the barge HM 08, made the final leg of her journey by way of the Welland Canal and then Lake Erie from Hamilton to Port Burwell, while being towed by the tugs Lac Manitoba and Seahound.

The sub arrived in Port Burwell on 20 November after a short journey and became part of a new Museum of Naval History. The site opened for tours on 29 June 2013. During April 2015, financial issues dealing with the transfer of the submarine to Port Burwell were widely circulated, as Royal Bank of Canada called on the community to pay the $6 million loan.
