= Oberon-class submarine =

1960s British submarine class

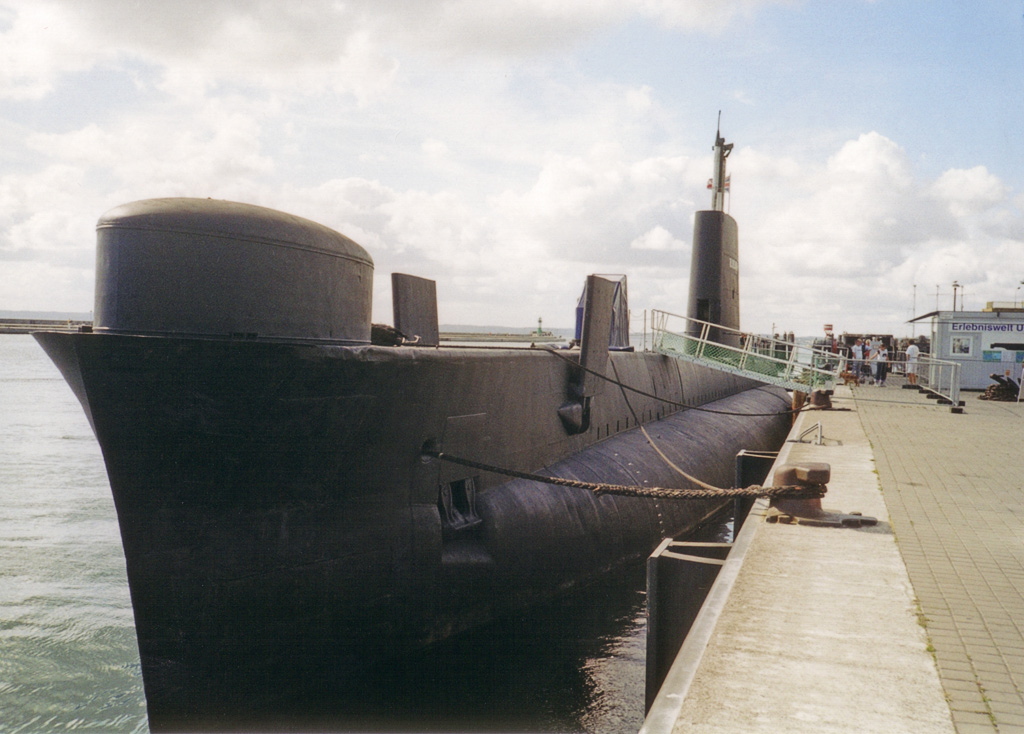
- HMS Otus moored at a dock in 2002.

Class overview
- Name: Oberon class
- Builders: Vickers-Armstrongs; Cammell Laird; Chatham Dockyard; Scotts Shipbuilding and Engineering Company
- Operators: Royal Navy; Royal Australian Navy; Royal Canadian Navy; Brazilian Navy; Chilean Navy
- Preceded by: Porpoise class
- Succeeded by: Upholder class and Collins class
- In commission: 1960–2000
- Completed: 27
- Retired: 27
- Preserved: 8 complete, 3 partial

General characteristics for Royal Navy submarines
- Type: Attack/Patrol submarine
- Displacement: Surfaced: 2,030 t (2,000 long tons); Submerged: 2,410 t (2,370 long tons)
- Length: 295.2 ft (90.0 m)
- Beam: 26.5 ft (8.1 m)
- Draught: 18 ft (5.5 m)
- Propulsion: 2 × 1,840 hp Admiralty Standard Range V16 diesels; 2 × 1,280 kW generators; 2 × 3,000 hp electric motors, diesel-electric; 2 shafts
- Speed: Surfaced: 12 knots (22 km/h; 14 mph); Submerged: 17 knots (31 km/h; 20 mph)
- Range: 10,350 nautical miles (19,170 km; 11,910 mi) at surface cruising speed
- Test depth: 650 ft (200 m)
- Complement: 7 officers; 62 sailors
- Sensors & processing systems: Type 1002 surface search and navigation radar; Type 187 Active-Passive attack sonar; Type 2007 long range passive sonar
- Electronic warfare & decoys: MEL Manta UAL or UA4 radar warning
- Armament: 6 × 21 in (533.4 mm) bow tubes, 20 torpedoes; 2 × 21 in (533.4 mm) short stern tubes, 2 torpedoes; Forward torpedo payload could be replaced with 50 × mines
- Notes: • Taken from: • For differing characteristics in non-Royal Navy Oberons, see the Regional variants section or individual submarine articles

The Oberon class was a ship class of 27 British-designed submarines operated by five nations. They were designed as a follow-on from the Porpoise class; physical dimensions were the same but stronger materials were used in hull construction and improved equipment was fitted.

The Oberons operated during the Cold War, with duties including surveillance, tracking of other ships and submarines, delivery and retrieval of special forces personnel and serving as targets for anti-submarine training. Submarines of the class were in service until 2000.

The Oberon class was arguably the best conventional submarine class of its time, with a reputation for remarkable quietness. The quietness of the Oberon vessels enabled them to operate into the late 20th century until replaced by newer classes such as the Collins and Victoria classes in Australia and Canada, respectively.

The submarines were built between 1957 and 1978 by four shipyards: Cammell Laird (4), Chatham Dockyard (6), Scotts Shipbuilding and Engineering Company (11) and Vickers-Armstrongs (6). Thirteen of the submarines were operated by the Royal Navy, six by the Royal Australian Navy, three by the Brazilian Navy, three by the Royal Canadian Navy/Canadian Forces Maritime Command (plus two ex-Royal Navy boats later acquired for non-commissioned roles), and two by the Chilean Navy.

== Design and construction ==
The 295.2-foot (90.0 m)-long Oberon class was based on the preceding Porpoise class of submarines, which were in service from 1956 to 1988. Changes from the Porpoise design were primarily to improve the strength and stealth of the submarine. Instead of UXW steel, the hull was built from QT28 steel, which was easier to fabricate and stronger, allowing the submarine to dive deeper. Glass-reinforced plastic was used in construction of the casing.

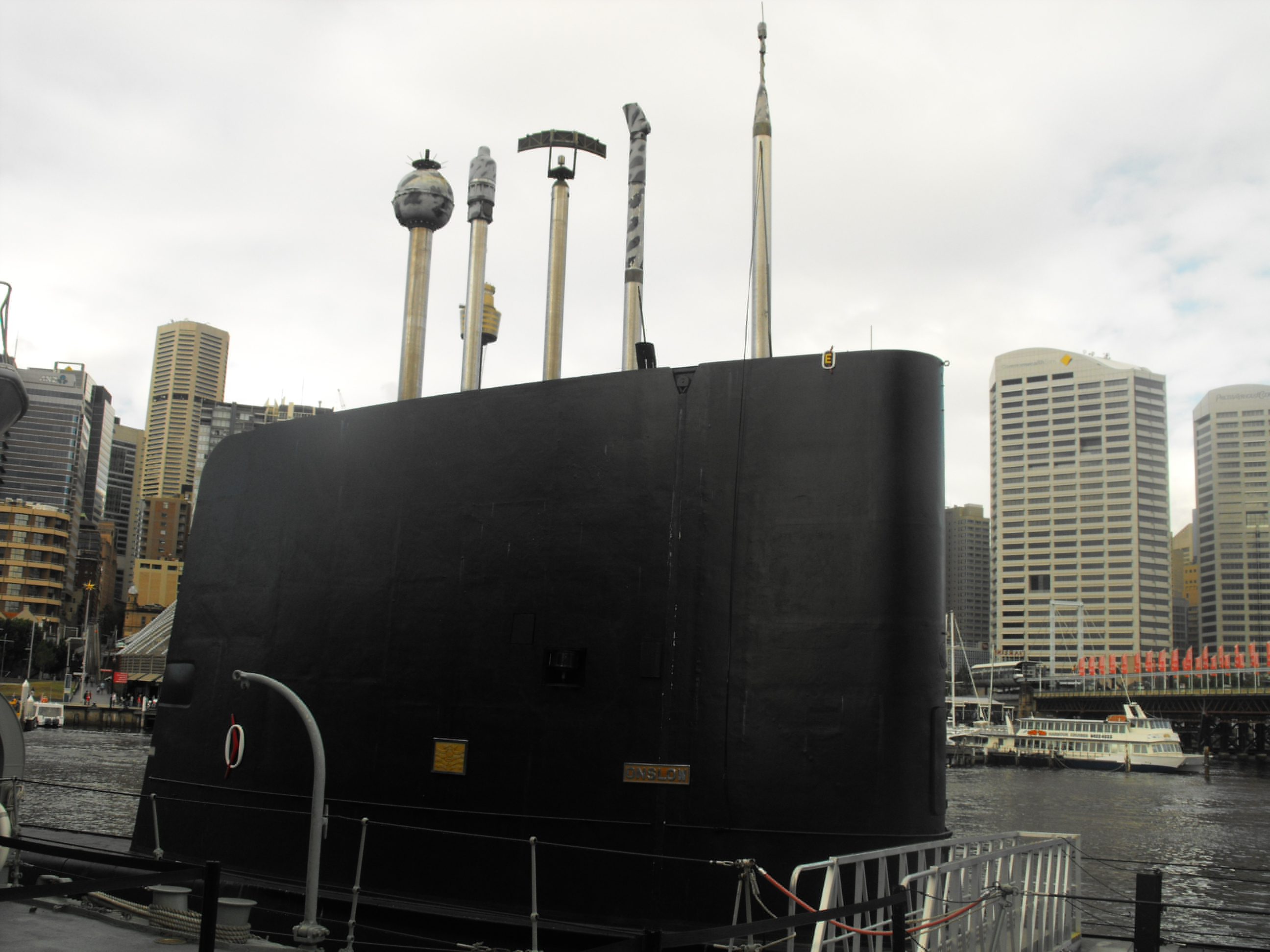
The fin and equipment masts of HMAS Onslow

Electronics, sonar, and radar systems were also upgraded to the latest standard. The submarines were equipped with a type 1002 surface search and navigation radar, a type 187 active-passive attack sonar, and a type 2007 long-range passive sonar. The Oberons were constructed at a variety of shipyards in the United Kingdom: the six Australian and two Chilean submarines by Scotts Shipbuilding and Engineering Company (the latter were built after the Scott Lithgow merger); the three Brazilian submarines by Vickers-Armstrongs; and the three Canadian submarines at Chatham Dockyard. Construction of the British submarines was shared amongst four dockyards: the three mentioned above and Cammell Laird.

=== Armament ===
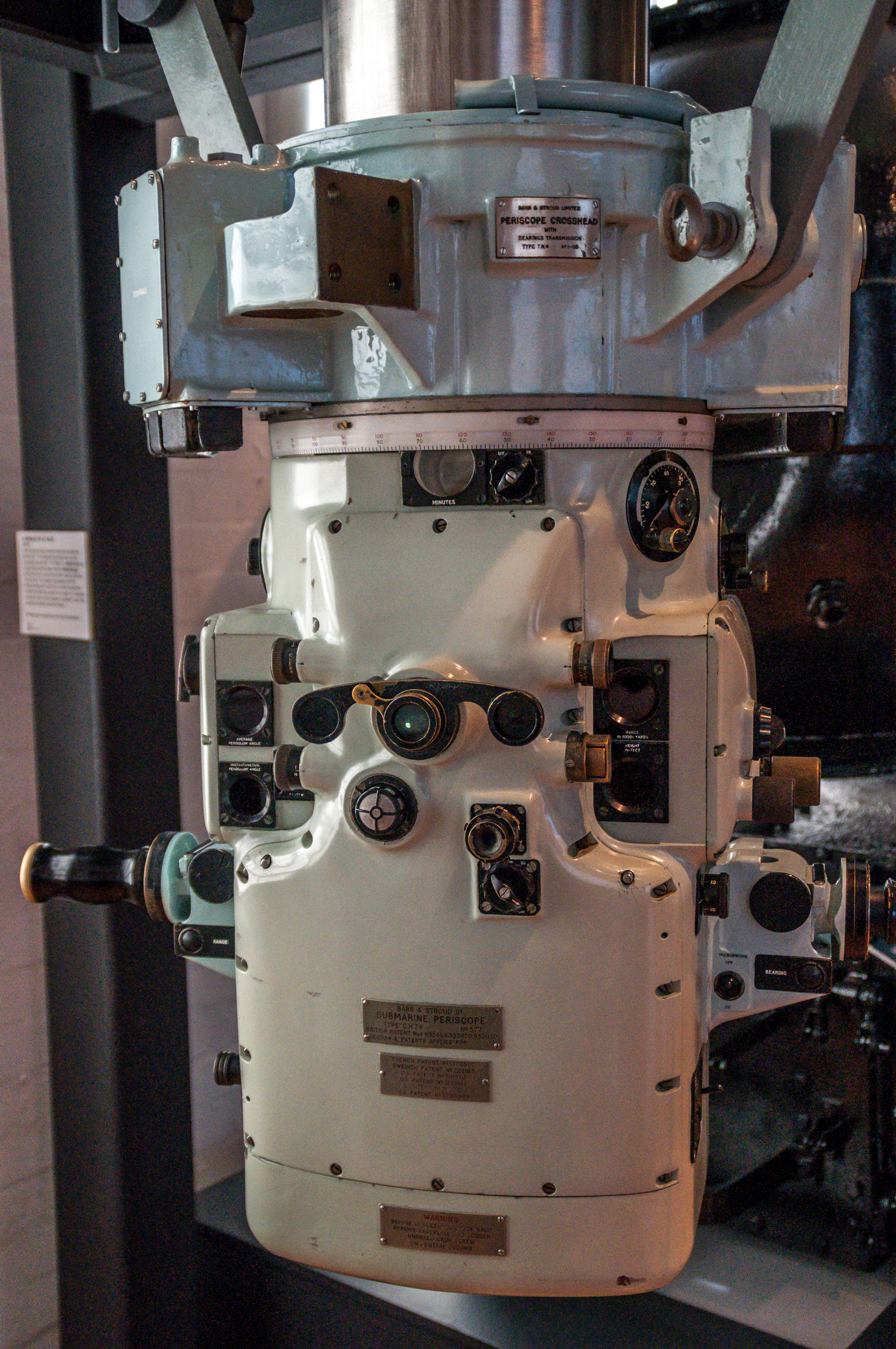
Barr and Stroud Attack Periscope Type CH74 – RAN Oberon-class submarine

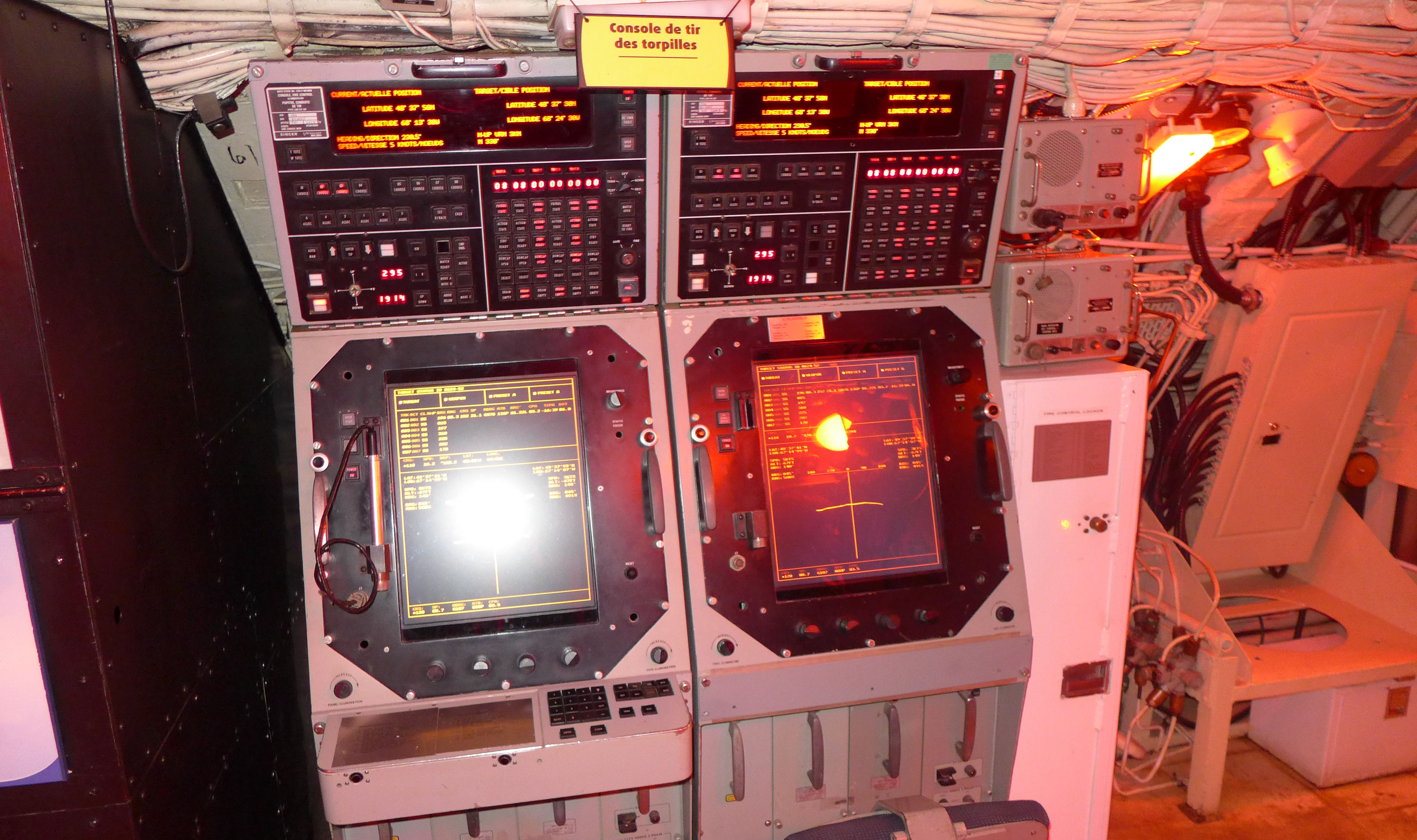
Torpedo fire control consoles aboard HMCS Onondaga

The Oberons were originally armed with eight 21-inch (533.4 mm) torpedo tubes: six tubes in the bow, and two short tubes for antisubmarine defence in the stern. The submarine normally carried a payload of 20 torpedoes for the forward tubes; a mix of Mark 24 Tigerfish and Mark 8 torpedoes, while only the two preloaded Mark 20S torpedoes were carried for the stern tubes. Naval mines could be carried instead of torpedoes: the torpedo payload would be replaced with up to 50 Mark 5 Stonefish or Mark 6 Sea Urchin mines.

The forward torpedo tubes are constructed in two sections bolted together across the bulkhead at the fore end of the torpedo compartment. The 116-inch (290 cm) long inner section is constructed of 0.5-inch (1.3 cm) rolled steel fitted with welded flanges and support brackets. The outer section is constructed of a similar tube 175 inches (440 cm) long but with a reinforced 1.125-inch (2.86 cm) thick section behind the main bulkhead. The internal door hinges at one side with two locking mechanisms, a swing bolt opposite the hinge and a rotating locking ring attached to the tube which presses down on the ten projecting lugs around the door. The outer end of the tube is sealed with a domed bow cap. Bow shutters close across the bow caps so as to preserve the streamlined shape of the bow when the cap is closed.

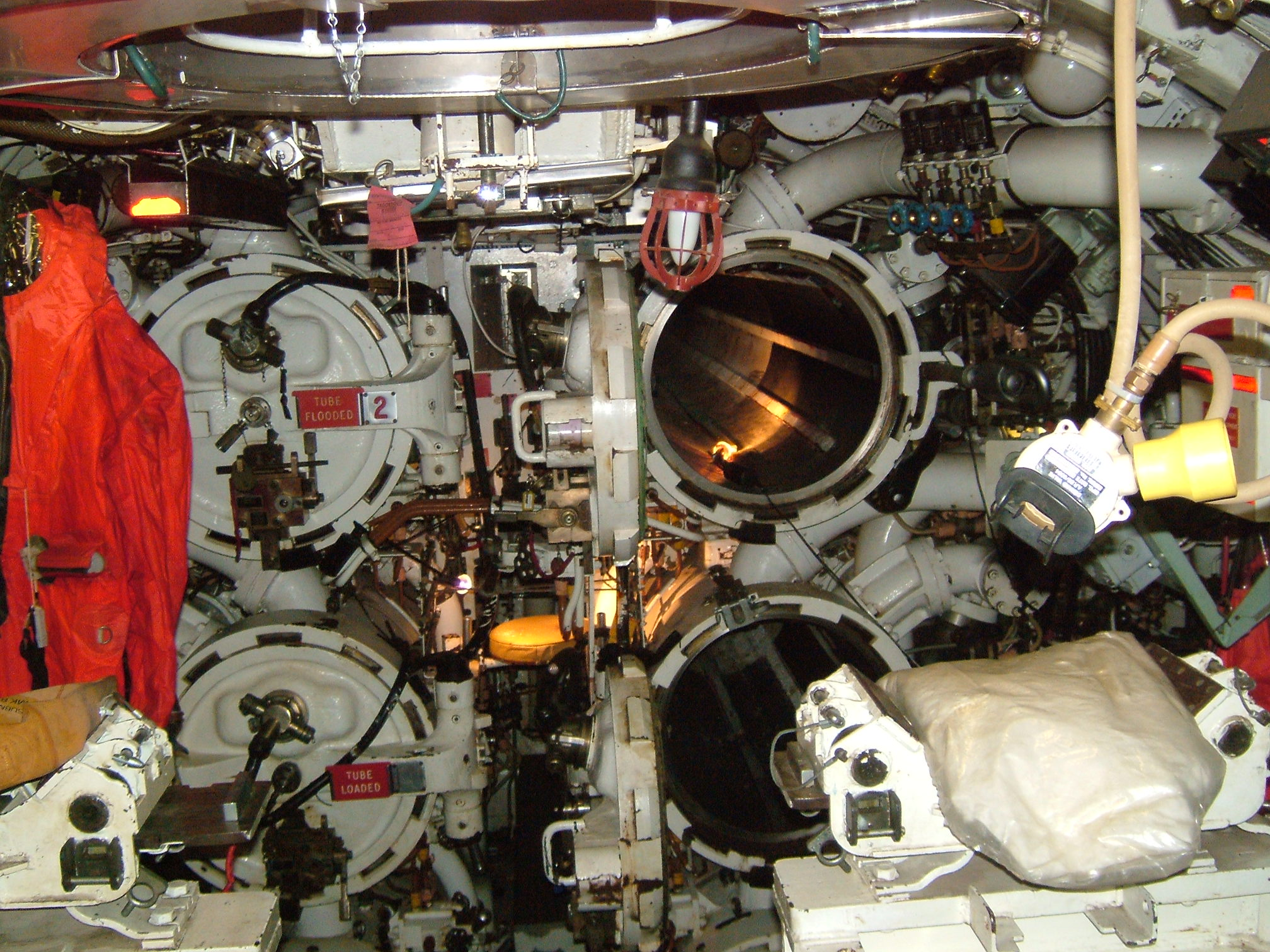
Forward torpedo tubes on HMS Ocelot

The bow caps and shutters are mechanically linked to a hydraulically operated drive rod from within the torpedo compartment. The bow cap opens first behind the shutter, which then folds back against it forming a smooth exit tube. Interlocks prevent the doors at both ends being opened at the same time but the inner door is also provided with a test cock to check whether the tube is full of water before opening and remains held nearly closed by the swing bolt after the locking ring is released. The tube internal diameter is 22.5 in, wider than the torpedo, which is designed as a loose fit inside the tube. Torpedoes could be fired either electrically or with compressed air.

The aft torpedo tubes passed through the ballast tank at the rear of the submarine. A 31-inch (79 cm) section projected into the boat through the bulkhead, forming overall a relatively short tube of 12 feet (3.7 m), but of 25-inch (640 mm) diameter.

With the retirement of the Mark 20S torpedo in the 1980s, the stern torpedo tubes were decommissioned and the torpedo ballast tanks were thereafter used for storage of additional stores such as beer.

=== Propulsion systems ===
The class used diesel-electric propulsion, with lead-acid batteries to provide power when the engines cannot be used. Each vessel has two Admiralty-pattern V-16 diesel engines (ASR1 16VMS), each driving one 1280-kW 880-V generator. These can provide power directly to the two 3,000-brake-horsepower (2,200 kW) electric motors, one directly connected to each propeller, or for charging batteries. The diesel engines can only be operated with external ventilation, but this can be obtained either while on the surface or when shallowly submerged by use of two snorkels which can be raised from the fin. One snorkel brings in new air to the boat, while the other takes exhaust fumes from the engines. The ventilation system is designed so the fresh air spreads through the boat.

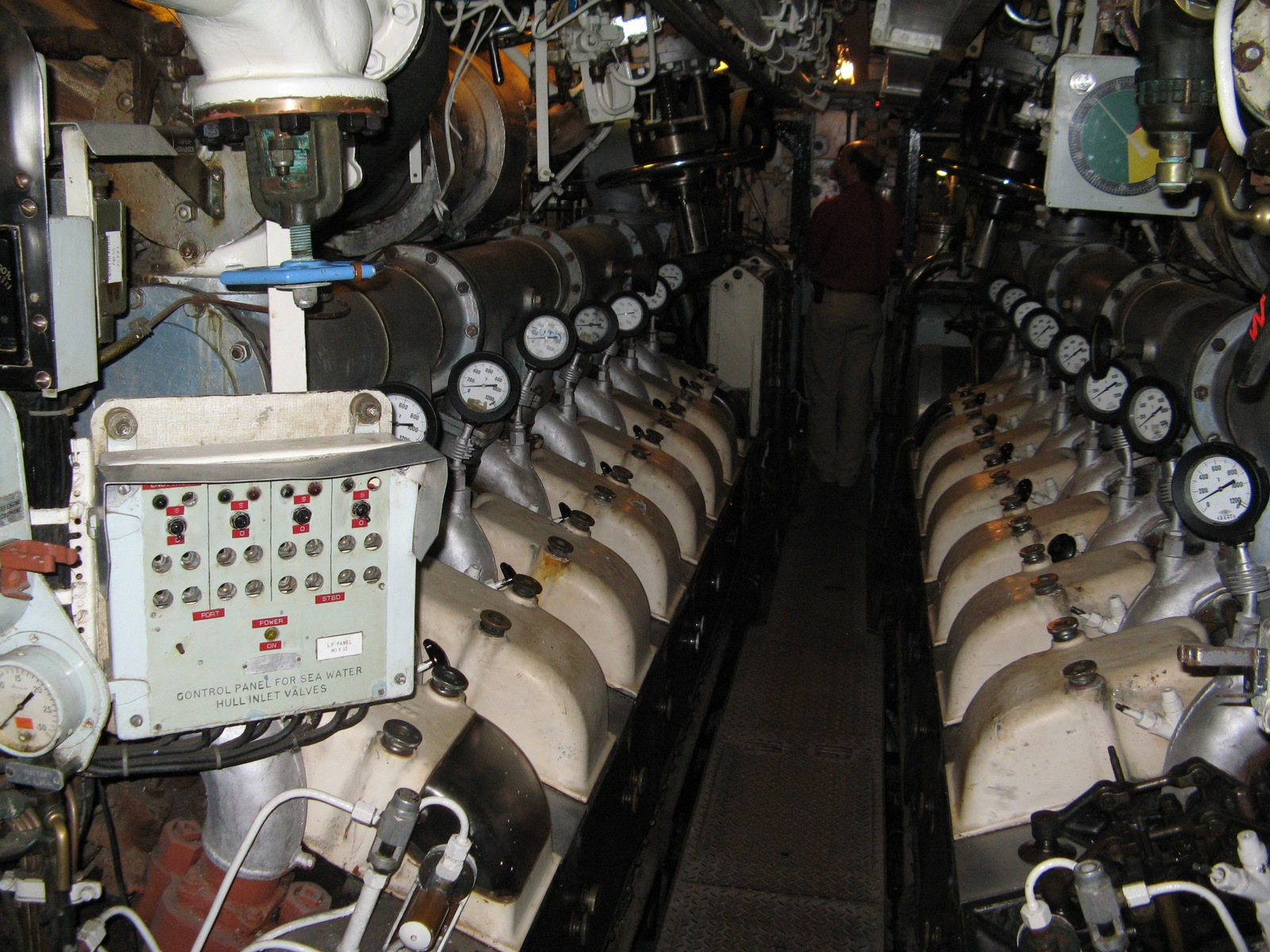
Engine compartment on HMS Otus, twin V16 diesel engines

The generators are cooled by an internal fan on the shaft which circulates air through a filter and water-cooled heat exchanger within the casing. A grill allows pressure equalisation inside and out. The generator has one pedestal bearing fed with oil from the diesel engine lubrication supply and is fitted with an internal heater to prevent condensation when not running.

The submarine has two batteries, each comprising 224 2V cells (type D7420) giving a nominal 440 V output. One battery is located underneath the crew accommodation compartment, and the other under the control compartment. Each battery has a switch circuit in the middle so it can be split into two banks of 112 cells. The cells are designed to deliver 7420 Ah at the five hour discharge rate. All steelwork within the battery compartments is lined with rubber to protect the metal from attack by acid, and also all conducting material is insulated to prevent risks of electric shock. Waxed timber is used to make framing and crawlways to access the batteries and support them because of its resistance to acid. The battery compartment has a sump to collect any spilled liquids. Each cell weighs 1,120 lb (510 kg) and contains 18.5 gallons of electrolyte. Cells are held tightly in place with wooden wedges to prevent movement with the boat. Each cell has four connector bolts to each electrode and an agitator pipe which bubbles air through the cell to ensure the electrolyte remains mixed and uniform. Cooling water is fed through pipes attached to the electrode connectors to prevent overheating and the battery temperature is monitored.

In operation, each battery is charged until the voltage reaches 560 V, then allowed a further hour's charging. Fortnightly, it should be allowed 5 hours' charging after reaching 560 V to ensure a maximum charge is reached. Every two months, the battery should be given an equalising charge of eight hours to ensure all cells have reached their maximum. The battery is designed to operate with a specific gravity of the electrolyte between 1.080 and 1.280. Initial charging current should be around 1650 amps for s.g. below 1.180, 1250 A above 1.180, falling to 280 A when charging is complete. At a voltage around 538 V, the cells begin to give off explosive hydrogen gas, so the applied power is reduced during charging to keep voltage below this value until current falls to 280 A, which is then maintained while voltage is allowed to rise until the requisite voltage and charge time are reached. In an emergency, the charging current can be raised to 2000 A. To maintain overall capacity, batteries need to be completely discharged over a five-hour period once every four months and then completely recharged. The battery compartments are sealed to prevent gases escaping into the submarine, or salt water entering, which inside a battery would cause the release of poisonous chlorine gas. Ventilation fans are used to extract hydrogen released by the cells and catalytic converters are placed strategically through the submarine to remove hydrogen from the air by recombining it with oxygen to form water.

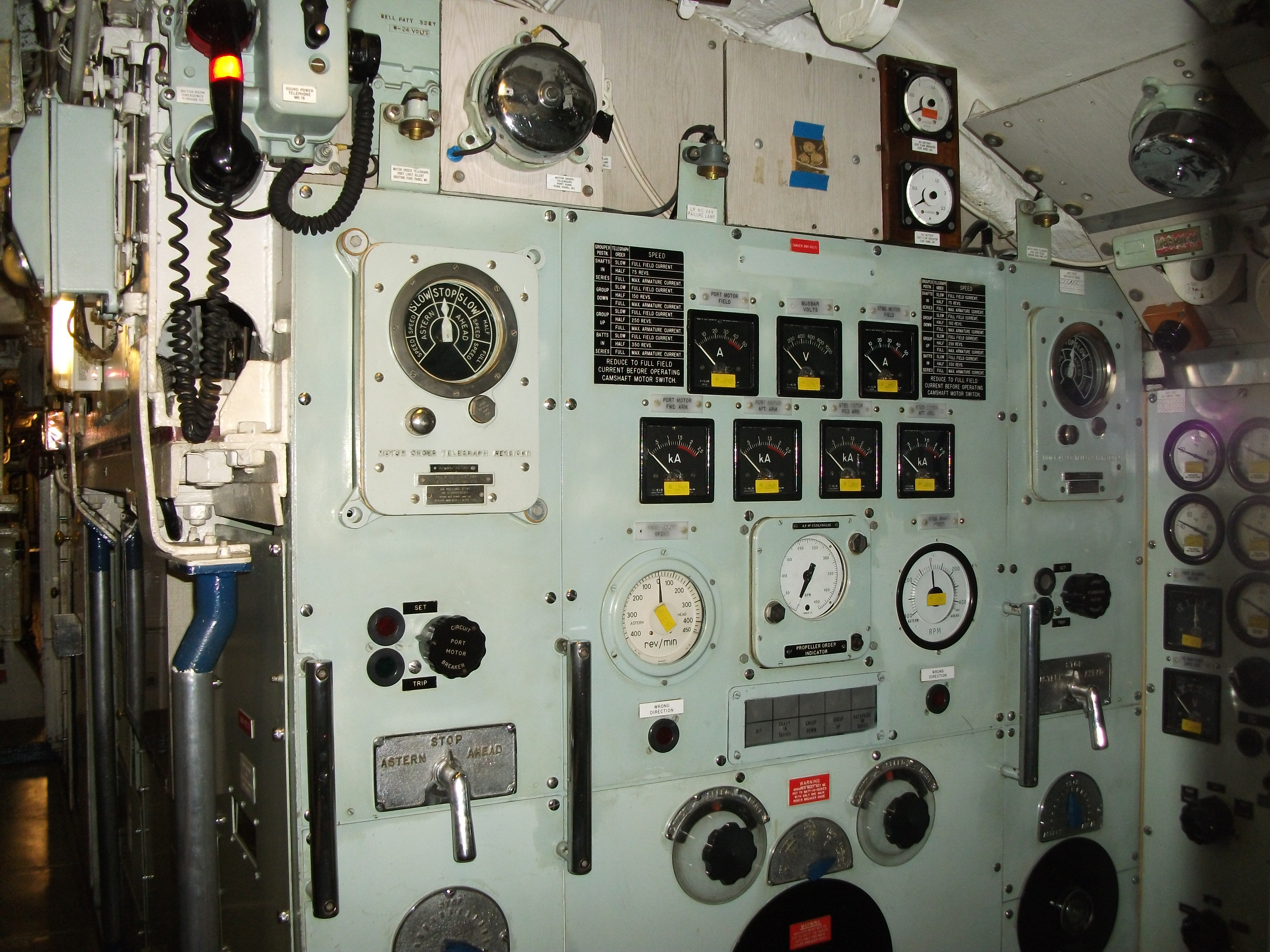
Propeller motor control panel: The panel telegraph (top and left) showed instructions issued from the motor telegraph position beside the helm station in the control room which were to be carried out.

Each of the two propellers on the submarine is connected to a 3000 bhp DC electric motor. Each motor is designed with two separate armatures, in effect two motors in the same unit. Speed of the submarine can be varied by connecting the batteries and armatures in different series and parallel combinations. Slowest speed is obtained by connecting both batteries in parallel, thus supplying 440 V, across all four motor armatures in series, thus applying 110 V to each ('shafts in series'). Next, the batteries in parallel may be applied across the two motors in parallel, with their armatures in series ('group down'). This applies 220 V across each armature. Third, both batteries are applied in parallel across all four armatures applying 440 V to each ('group up'). Finally, the batteries can be arranged in series so as to apply 880 V across all four armatures in parallel ('batteries in series'). Each armature also has an associated field winding which is separately supplied with current which may be varied resistively, providing further speed control (maximum 35 A).

The motors are designed with a sealed wet sump from which oil is pumped continuously to lubricate the bearings. A fan draws air from the engine room through the motor to cool it and returns the exhaust air to the engine room through a water-cooled heat exchanger. This arrangement reduces the possibility of water being drawn into the motor should there be a leak in the cooler. The motor is also fitted with a heater to keep it warm when not running so as to prevent condensation internally. Temperature and revolution speed are monitored and displayed on the control panel.

=== Auxiliary power ===
The batteries provide variable DC power (VP), which ranges in normal usage from 390 to 650 V. Pumps for ballast, water, air compressors, ventilation, cooling, and hydraulics are all designed to cope with this supply range, but some equipment cannot. The boat, therefore, is supplied with two sets of auxiliary motor generators designed to be powered by the batteries and produce stable output, one set powered by each main battery. A 220 V DC supply (CP) is provided by two 100 kW (130 hp) generators, one supplied from each battery with either being sufficient by itself. Two 15 kW (20 hp) 60 Hz three-phase alternators provide power for equipment designed to work off 115 or 230 V AC and two more 15 kW 400 Hz generators provide power at 205 V AC used by radar, sonar, fire control, and communications electronics. Two 4 kW (5.4 hp) generators plus an additional backup battery provide 24 V DC.

In the event of damage to the main electrical distribution system, provision is made for one of the CP generators to be connected directly to one armature of the port motor, to provide some propulsion by alternative circuitry.

=== Regional variations ===
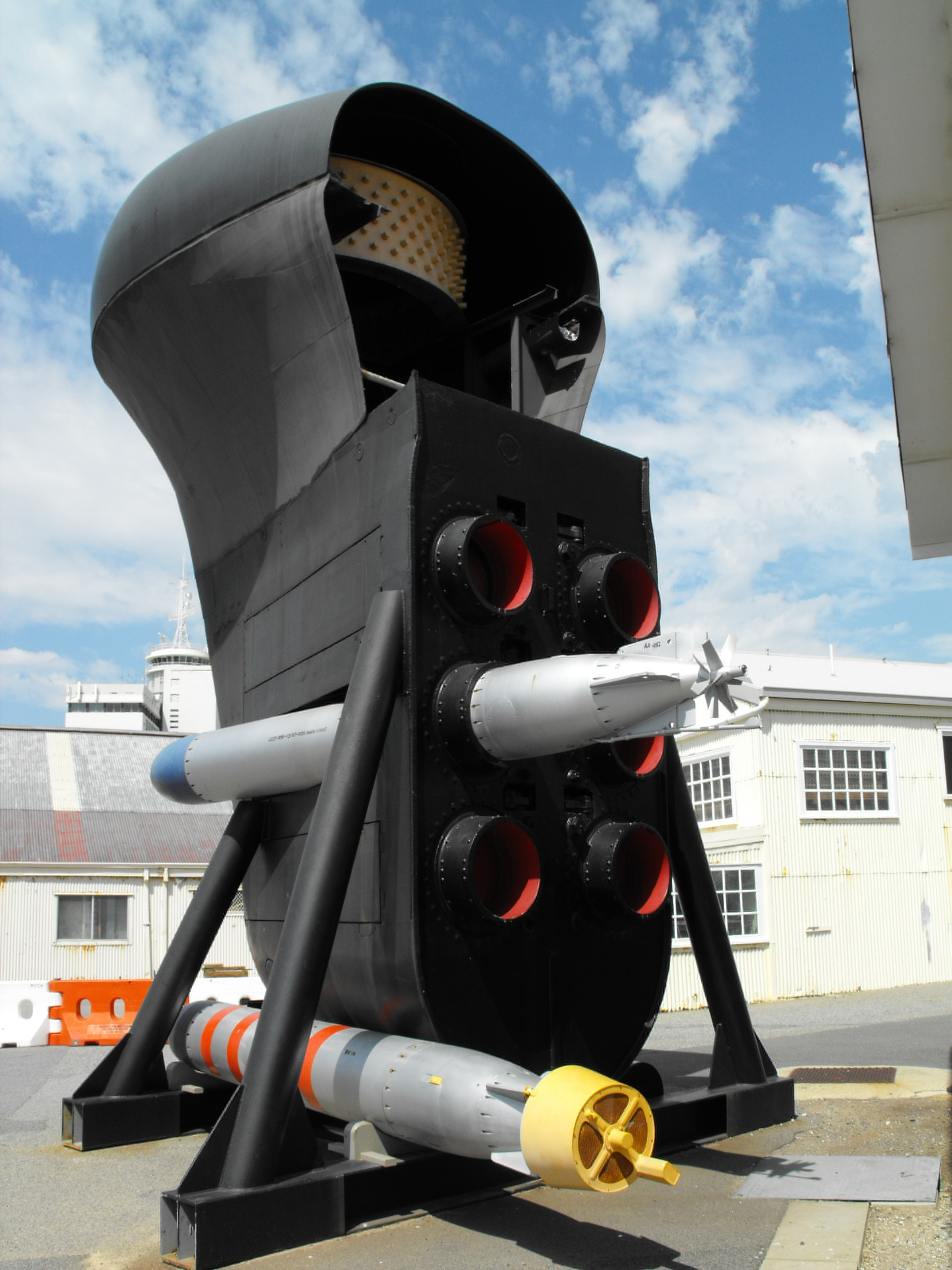
The preserved bow section of HMAS Oxley: The mouths of the six torpedo tubes are displayed, along with the modified sonar dome and a mockup of the bow sonar array.

Australia
The Royal Australian Navy acquired six Oberons: an initial order of four and a second order of two. The second order was originally for four submarines, but two were cancelled in favour of expanding the RAN Fleet Air Arm.
Australian Oberons had different electronic equipment, using primarily American sonar systems. They had Sperry BQG-4 Micropuffs passive ranging sonar and Krupp CSU3-41 attack sonar. Instead of the British Tigerfish torpedoes, the Australians used American Mark 48 torpedoes. They had a slightly larger payload, carrying 22 torpedoes for the forward tubes, six of which were preloaded. Shortly after entering service, the aft torpedo tubes in all six submarines were sealed.
The Australian submarines were later updated to be equipped with the subsonic antiship Harpoon missile. In 1985, off the island of Kauai in Hawaii, HMAS Ovens became only the second conventional submarine in the world—and the first Oberon—to fire a subsurface-launched Harpoon missile, successfully hitting the target over the horizon. Consequently, the designation for the Australian Oberons changed from SS to SSG.

Brazil
The main differences between the Brazilian and British Oberons was the fire-control systems, with a Vickers system being fitted to the Brazilian boats. The three Brazilian submarines were later upgraded to use the more advanced Mod 1 Tigerfish torpedo.

Canada
The three Canadian submarines were built with improved air-conditioning systems, while as many common components as possible were replaced with Canadian equivalents. The Canadian Oberons used United States Navy torpedoes throughout their career: they were initially equipped with Mark 37 torpedoes, but were later upgraded for the Mark 48s.

Chile
Chilean submarines were identical to their British counterparts except for carrying German SUT torpedoes.

== Service ==
=== British service ===
The first of the class to be commissioned into the Royal Navy was Orpheus in 1960, followed by the name vessel in 1961. The last to be commissioned was Onyx in 1967. Six were commissioned between 1967 and 1978 for the RAN. In 1982, Onyx took part in the Falklands War, the only conventional submarine of the RN to do so, landing members of the SBS. She was escorted back to UK at 5 kn after hitting an undetected submerged reef which damaged two of its torpedo tubes, trapping a Tigerfish torpedo. It was removed back at Portsmouth.

All Oberons in service, including boats exported, have now been decommissioned; the last RN boats were decommissioned in 1993, with the final Canadian and Australian Oberons decommissioned in 2000.

=== Canadian acquisition ===
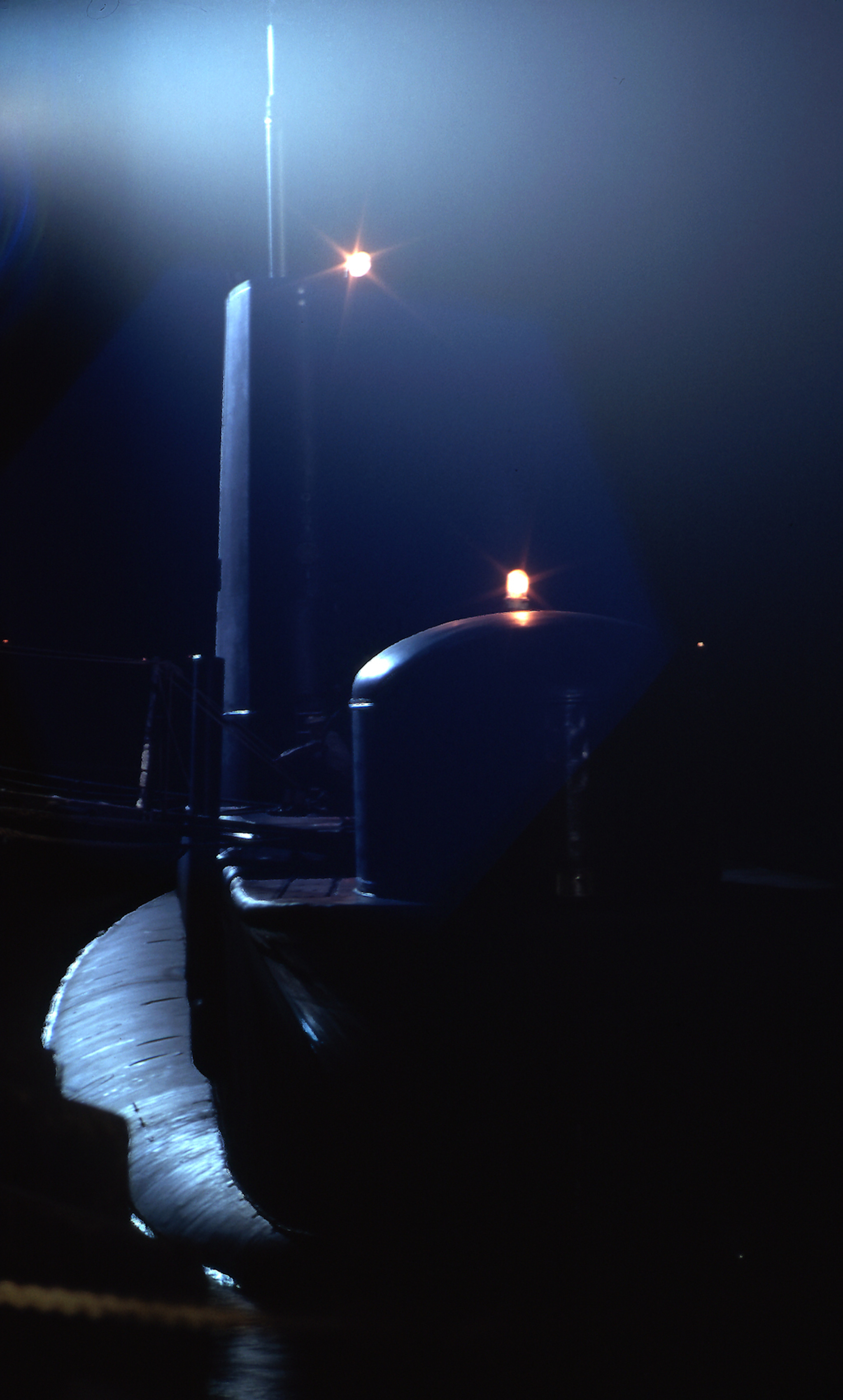
A Canadian Oberon-class submarine alongside in Rosy Roads for Operation Springboard; January 1969

Beginning in 1957, Canada began looking at acquiring submarines to replace the training 6th Submarine Division provided by the Royal Navy at Halifax, Nova Scotia. A proposal was submitted to the Canadian Chiefs of Staff in November 1959 affirming the need for a Canadian submarine service and to incorporate the acquisition of the subs into the fleet renewal plan of the late 1950s. The subs would be part of Canada's effort to rectify the problem of block obsolescence in its surface fleet. In 1960 two options were presented to the Canadian government, the first suggesting the acquisition of expensive Barbel-class submarines and the second proposing the purchase of six cheaper Oberons as part of a larger package of vessels. In March 1962, Cabinet recommended the purchase of three Oberons and eight frigates, on the condition that the cost of acquiring the submarines from the United Kingdom would be offset by British defence purchases in Canada. It was also supplement by Balao-class submarine trainer HMCS Grilse S-71 (former USS Burrfish SS-312) beginning in 1961. On 11 April 1962, the purchase was announced in the House of Commons of Canada by the Minister of National Defence, Douglas Harkness.

However, the Conservative government postponed the acquisition of the Oberons due to the slow speed of the United Kingdom's attempt to offset the acquisition. The Conservative government was defeated in 1963 and the incoming Liberal government suspended all major defence procurement projects upon taking power. The United Kingdom, in an effort to get the contract moving, offered the hulls of Ocelot and Opportune, but Canada passed on them. However, when Onyx became available, Canada took up the offer. The final price of $40 million for the entire contract was agreed upon in 1963.

Since Onyx was already under construction, the boat was finished to Royal Navy specifications. All three boats received modifications to the original Oberon design, which included the enlargement of the snort de-icer, a different weapons fit, a larger air conditioning unit, active sonar and different communications equipment. The second and third hulls were built to Canadian specifications, which moved the galley forward of the control room to make room for the sonar equipment. This led to the removal of three crew bunks, a problem that was never rectified in the submarines and led to an accommodation issue for the crew.

The first submarine was scheduled to be delivered in 1965, with the following two in 1967 and 1968, respectively. The three boats were given First Nations names; Onyx being renamed Ojibwa, Onondaga and Okanagan. They entered service on 23 September 1965, 22 June 1967 and 22 June 1968 respectively for service as "clockwork mice", submarines used to train surface vessels in anti-submarine warfare.

Two further Oberons were acquired but never commissioned into the Canadian Navy. In 1989, Olympus was acquired as a stationary training vessel at Halifax, Nova Scotia. In 1992 Osiris was acquired for cannibalisation in a spare parts program between the UK and Canada. The submarine never sailed and was taken apart in the UK to arrive in Canada in 22,050 pieces in 1993.

==== Submarine Operational Update Program (SOUP) ====
By the late 1970s, the Oberons in Canadian service had become obsolete and were in need of an update. Planning was done in 1978 and the program approved in February 1979. In an effort to take the subs from anti-submarine warfare training to frontline service, Maritime Command developed a refit program that included new sonars, periscopes, communications and fire-control systems. They also had their armament upgraded with the fitting of torpedo tubes capable of firing the Mk 48 torpedo. This would allow the submarines to be deployed by NATO in the North Atlantic to monitor Soviet submarines.

By 1975, the fire control system aboard the Canadian Oberons was obsolete. Spare parts from the UK were becoming rarer. The Submarine Operational Update Program (SOUP) was developed to deal with the operational capability of the submarines along with a Logistic Support Agreement (LSA) to acquire more spare parts. The SOUP refits were performed during the submarines' mid-life refits. The LSA was finalised in 1989, with the acquisition of Olympus as a training vessel. However, the LSA was deemed insufficient by 1992 and the Canadian government acquired Osiris for cannibalisation.

The SOUP refits comprised a new US fire control system, a digital Singer Librascope Mark I, and new Sperry passive ranging sonar with the Type 719 short range sonar removed. The new sonar was placed in the upper casing on the pressure hull. New communications and navigational systems were installed. The submarines were fitted with new torpedo tubes for Mk 48 torpedoes; however, the torpedoes themselves were considered a separate procurement program, which was only finalised in 1985.

Between 1980 and 1986, one of the Canadian Oberons was out of service undergoing the refit. SOUP came in on time and on its budget of $45 million in 1986. SOUP kept the Canadian Oberons until the end of the 1990s when they were replaced by the British Upholder-class submarines.

=== Chilean service ===
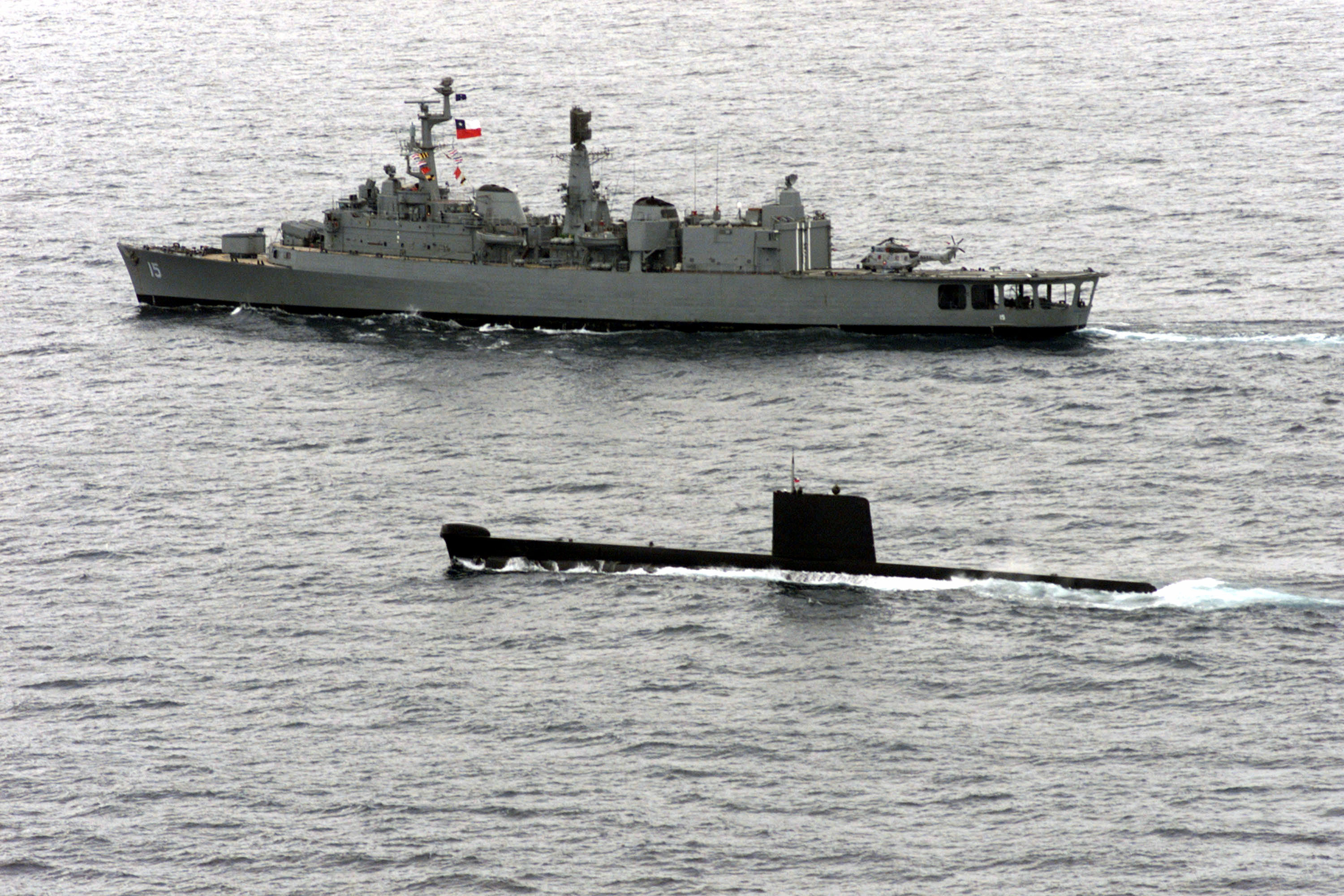
Chilean submarine O'Brien operating with the destroyer Blanco Encalada during exercise Teamwork South 1999

The Chilean government required two Oberon-class submarines to be built by Scott's Shipbuilders Engineering Co., Ltd. The first was built in 1971 and launched on 22 December 1972 and given the name O'Brien, arriving at Punta Arenas on 10 August 1976. The second submarine, built in 1972, launched on 26 September 1973, was given the name Hyatt. The submarine arrived at Punta Arenas on 10 February 1977. These two submarines were able to achieve a speed of 12 knots surfaced and 17 knots submerged. With a length of 90 meters and a displacement of 2,030 tons surfaced and 2,410 tons submerged, the submarines had a 6,000 bhp engine to power them. The submarines were fitted with eight 21-inch torpedo tubes. Both submarines remained in service until 31 December 2001 where they were replaced by Scorpène-class submarines.

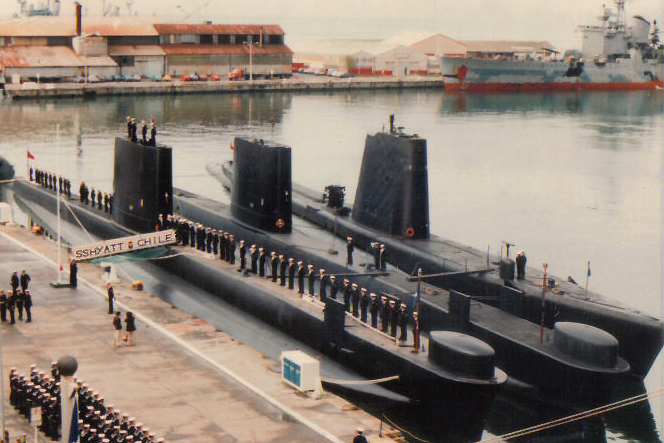
Oberon-class submarines Hyatt and O'Brien docked together with the submarine Simpson

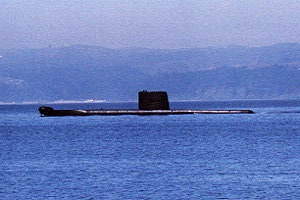
Oberon-class submarine Hyatt, picture by the Chilean Navy

=== Australian service ===
Australian Oberon-class submarines were reported to have regularly conducted operations with special forces, although due to their limited capability these were restricted to circumstances where the boat could surface, and were usually conducted at night. This included placing divers under the casing for further covert movement, or disembarking special forces teams using kayaks or inflatable boats.

== Fates ==
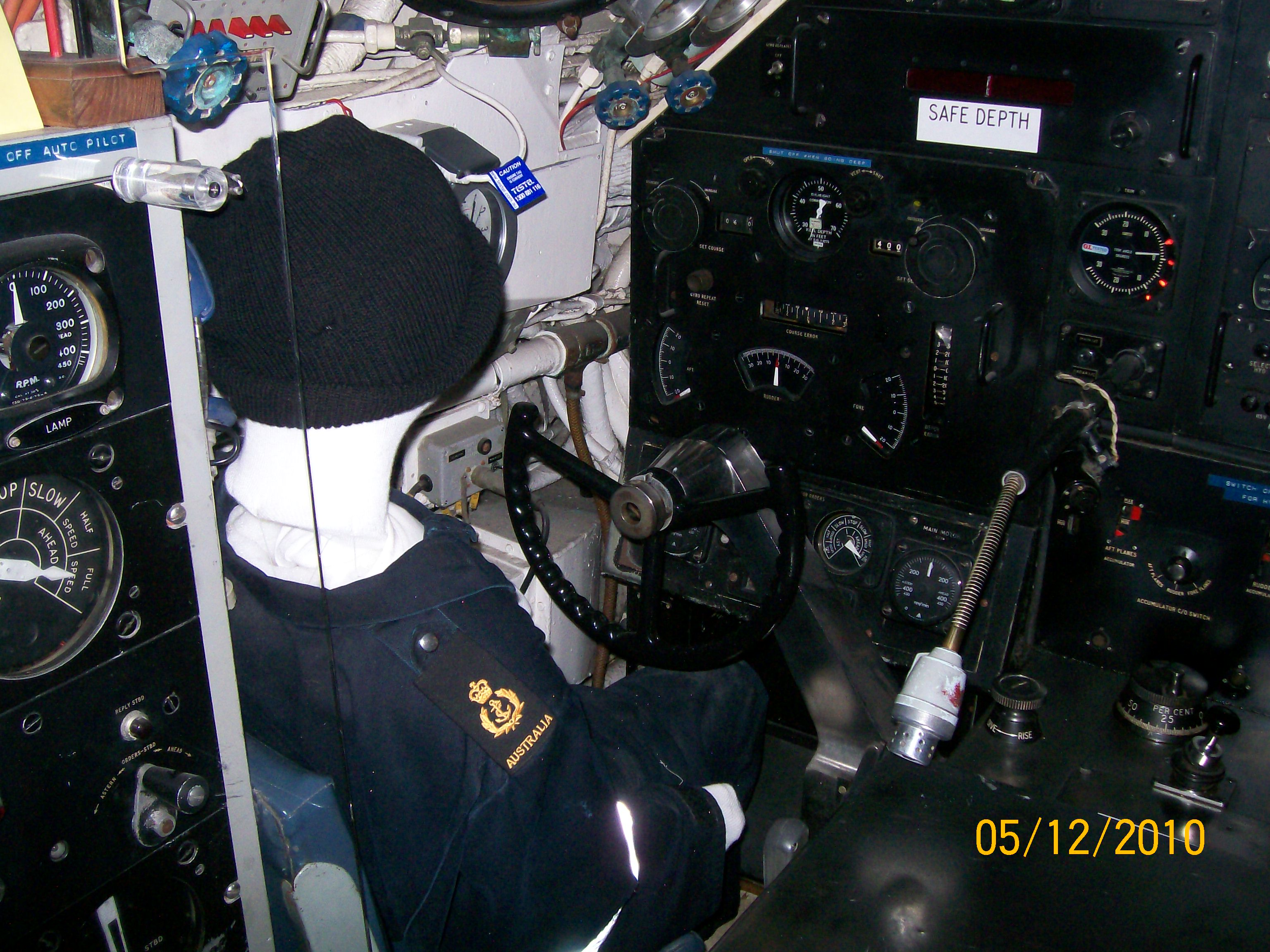
Helm station aboard HMAS Ovens at the Western Australian Maritime Museum

As of 2015, eight of the submarines are preserved intact as museum vessels, another three are partially preserved (with some exterior portions of the submarine on display). The rest have been sold for scrap, including one former museum vessel.

Two of the ex-Royal Navy submarines were preserved in the UK but only one remains. HMS Onyx was moved to Barrow-in-Furness after the museum at Birkenhead, Merseyside closed but was later towed to Gareloch in Scotland where she was broken for scrap in 2014 after failed attempts to turn her into a museum. The other boat, Ocelot, is located at Chatham. Otus is harboured in Sassnitz, Germany on the island of Rügen and can be visited. Another two British Oberons were transferred to Canada: Olympus as a non-commissioned training vessel, and Osiris for spare parts. The other British submarines were disposed of.

Five of Australia's six Oberons have been preserved and are on display, either completely or partially. HMAS Ovens is located at the Western Australian Maritime Museum at Fremantle, while HMAS Onslow is located at the Australian National Maritime Museum in Darling Harbour, Sydney. The fin, outer hull, and stern section of HMAS Otway are preserved on land at Holbrook, New South Wales. HMAS Oxley's fin stands as a permanent memorial at HMAS Stirling, Garden Island, Western Australia; while HMAS Oxley's bow is next to HMAS Ovens at the Western Australian Maritime Museum. HMAS Orion's fin stands as a permanent memorial at Rockingham Naval Memorial Park in Western Australia.

The only Australian Oberon fully scrapped, HMAS Otama, was located off Crib Point in Westernport Bay, Victoria, between 2002 and 2022 where she awaited conversion into a museum vessel; a lack of funding and co-operation from local and state governments means that the volunteer group hoping to preserve Otama attempted to sell the submarine on eBay but to no avail. Otama was scrapped in September 2022.

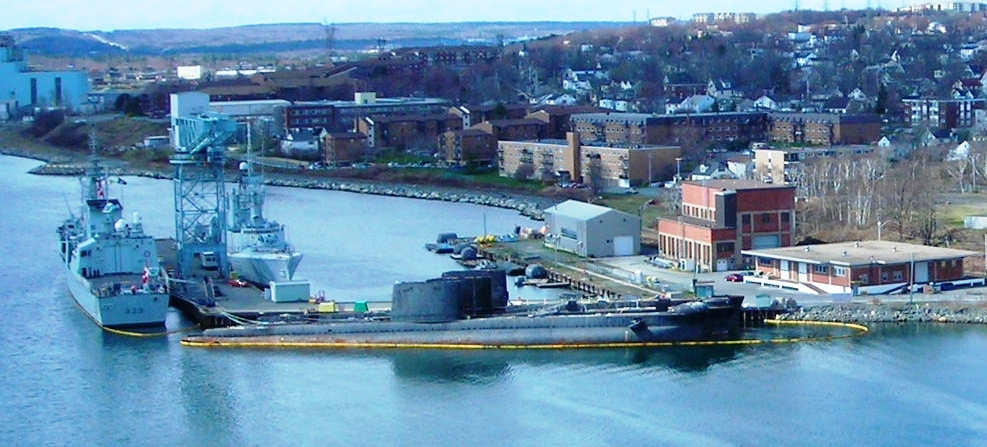
Three Oberon-class submarines laid up in Halifax Harbour

In 2005, it was announced that the four surviving Canadian submarines (minus Osiris, which was scrapped in 1992 after being stripped for parts) were to be sold for scrapping, as they had deteriorated beyond the point of use. Onondaga was purchased for C$4 plus tax by the Site historique maritime de la Pointe-au-Père for use as a museum vessel, and was towed from Halifax to Pointe-au-Père, Quebec in July 2008. In July 2011, Olympus was towed to a scrapyard in Port Maitland, Ontario, with Okanagan to be delivered to the same scrapyard in August 2011. Ojibwa has been preserved as part of the Elgin Military Museum. She was moved to Port Burwell, Ontario in November 2012, and will become a focal point of a new Museum of Naval History. Ojibwa opened for public tours in July 2013.

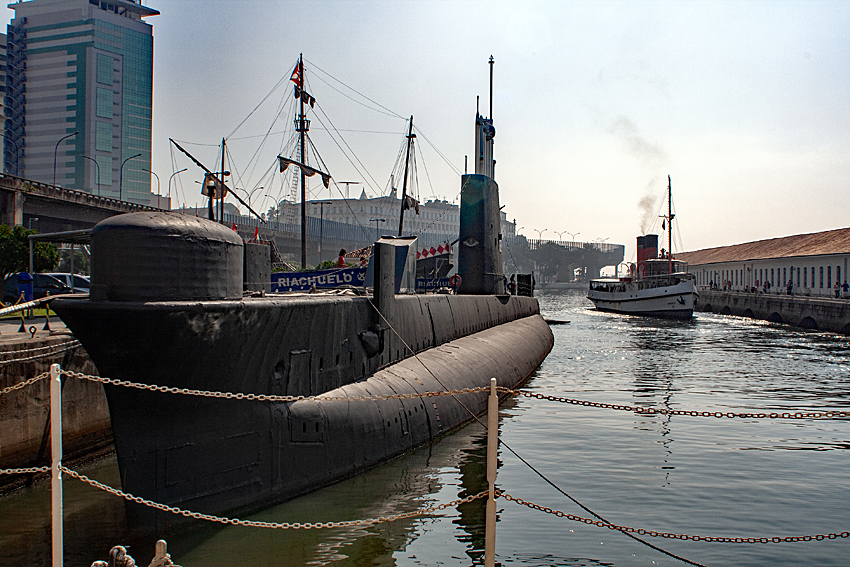
SS22 Riachuelo at the Brazilian Navy Cultural Centre

One of the Brazilian Oberons (Tonelero) sank while docked at the navy yards at the Praça Mauá on Rio de Janeiro, on 24 December 2000. The surviving Brazilian Oberon, Riachuelo, was converted into a museum at the Brazilian Navy Cultural Center (Espaço Cultural da Marinha Brasileira) in Rio de Janeiro.

The Chilean Navy sold O'Brien to the city of Valdivia in 2002, to be converted into the first submarine museum of Chile. The submarine went through a series of modifications in the ASMAR shipyards during that year, and as of December 2017, is on display at the end of Avenida Costanera Arturo Prat, in front of the Corte de Apelaciones building.

=== Successors ===
The Oberon class was briefly succeeded in RN service by the Upholder-class submarine. The Upholder-class submarines were later upgraded and sold to Canada for service in the Royal Canadian Navy after refit as the Victoria class, again replacing Oberons.

The Australian Oberons were replaced by six Collins-class submarines.

The two Chilean Oberons were replaced by the Scorpène-class submarines O'Higgins and Carrera.

The Brazilian Oberons were replaced by Type 209 submarines.

== See also ==
- List of Oberon-class submarines
- List of submarines of the Royal Navy

Equivalent submarines of the same era

- Barbel class
- Dolfijn class
- Foxtrot class
- Narval class
- Romeo class
