= HMS Osiris (S13) =

Submarine of the Royal Navy

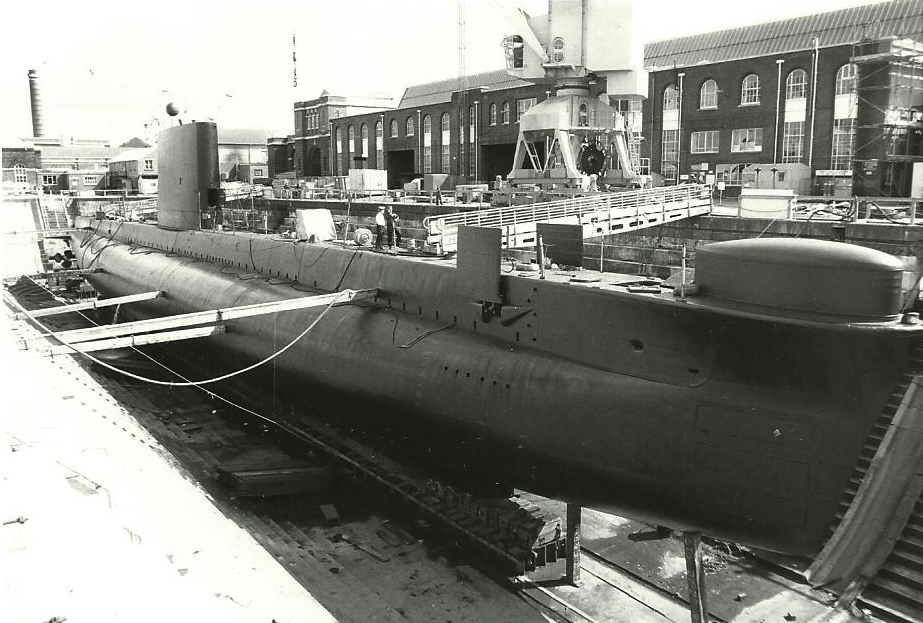
- HMS Osiris at Portsmouth Navy Days, August 1982

History

United Kingdom
- Name: Osiris
- Namesake: Osiris
- Builder: Vickers-Armstrongs at Barrow-in-Furness
- Laid down: 26 January 1962
- Launched: 29 November 1962
- Commissioned: 11 January 1964
- Decommissioned: 1989
- Fate: Sold to Canadian Forces, 1989
- Badge: Blazon azure with the profile of Osiris

Canada
- Acquired: 1989, for spare parts
- Fate: Scrapped, 1991

General characteristics as designed
- Class & type: Oberon class
- Displacement: 1,610 tons standard; 2,030 tons full load surfaced; 2,410 tons full load submerged
- Length: 241 feet (73 m) between perpendiculars; 295.2 feet (90.0 m) length overall
- Beam: 26.5 feet (8.1 m)
- Draught: 18 feet (5.5 m)
- Propulsion: 2 × Admiralty Standard Range 16 VMS diesel generators; 2 × 3,000 shaft horsepower (2,200 kW) electric motors; 2 shafts
- Speed: 17 knots (31 km/h; 20 mph) submerged; 12 knots (22 km/h; 14 mph) surfaced
- Complement: 68
- Sensors & processing systems: Type 186 and Type 187 sonars; I-band surface search radar
- Armament: 8 × 21-inch (530 mm) torpedo tubes (6 forward, 2 aft); 24 torpedoes

HMS Osiris (S13) was an Oberon-class submarine that served in the Royal Navy from 1964 to 1989.

== Design and construction ==
The Oberon class was a direct follow on of the Porpoise class, with the same dimensions and external design, but updates to equipment and internal fittings, and a higher grade of steel used for fabrication of the pressure hull.

As designed for British service, the Oberon-class submarines were 241 feet (73 m) in length between perpendiculars and 295.2 feet (90.0 m) in length overall, with a beam of 26.5 feet (8.1 m), and a draught of 18 feet (5.5 m). Displacement was 1,610 tons standard, 2,030 tons full load when surfaced, and 2,410 tons full load when submerged. Propulsion machinery consisted of 2 Admiralty Standard Range 16 VMS diesel generators, and two 3,000 shaft horsepower (2,200 kW) electric motors, each driving a 7-foot diameter (2.1 m) 3-bladed propeller at up to 400 rpm. Top speed was 17 knots (31 km/h; 20 mph) when submerged, and 12 knots (22 km/h; 14 mph) on the surface. Eight 21-inch (530 mm) diameter torpedo tubes were fitted (six facing forward, two aft), with a total payload of 24 torpedoes. The boats were fitted with Type 186 and Type 187 sonars, and an I-band surface search radar. The standard complement was 68: 6 officers, 62 sailors.

Osiris was laid down by Vickers-Armstrongs on 26 January 1962, and launched on 29 November 1962. The boat was commissioned into the Royal Navy on 11 January 1964.

== Operational history ==
Osiris attended the 1977 Silver Jubilee Fleet Review off Spithead when she was part of the Submarine Flotilla.

The ship served as a minelayer during the Falklands War and saw her longest deployment during this period in 1984.

== Decommissioning and fate ==
She was decommissioned and sold to the Canadian Forces in 1989 for spare parts, towed to Birkenhead on the River Mersey where Cammell Laird shipyard completed the stripping out. In August 1991, the remains were moved to Garston for final demolition and scrapped in 1992.

== Publications ==
- Colledge, J. J.; Warlow, Ben (2006) [1969]. Ships of the Royal Navy: The Complete Record of All Fighting Ships of the Royal Navy from the 15th Century to the Present (3rd Rev ed.). London: Chatham Publishing. ISBN 978-1-86176-281-8. OCLC 67375475.
