= Sassnitz =

Town in Mecklenburg-Vorpommern, Germany

- Town
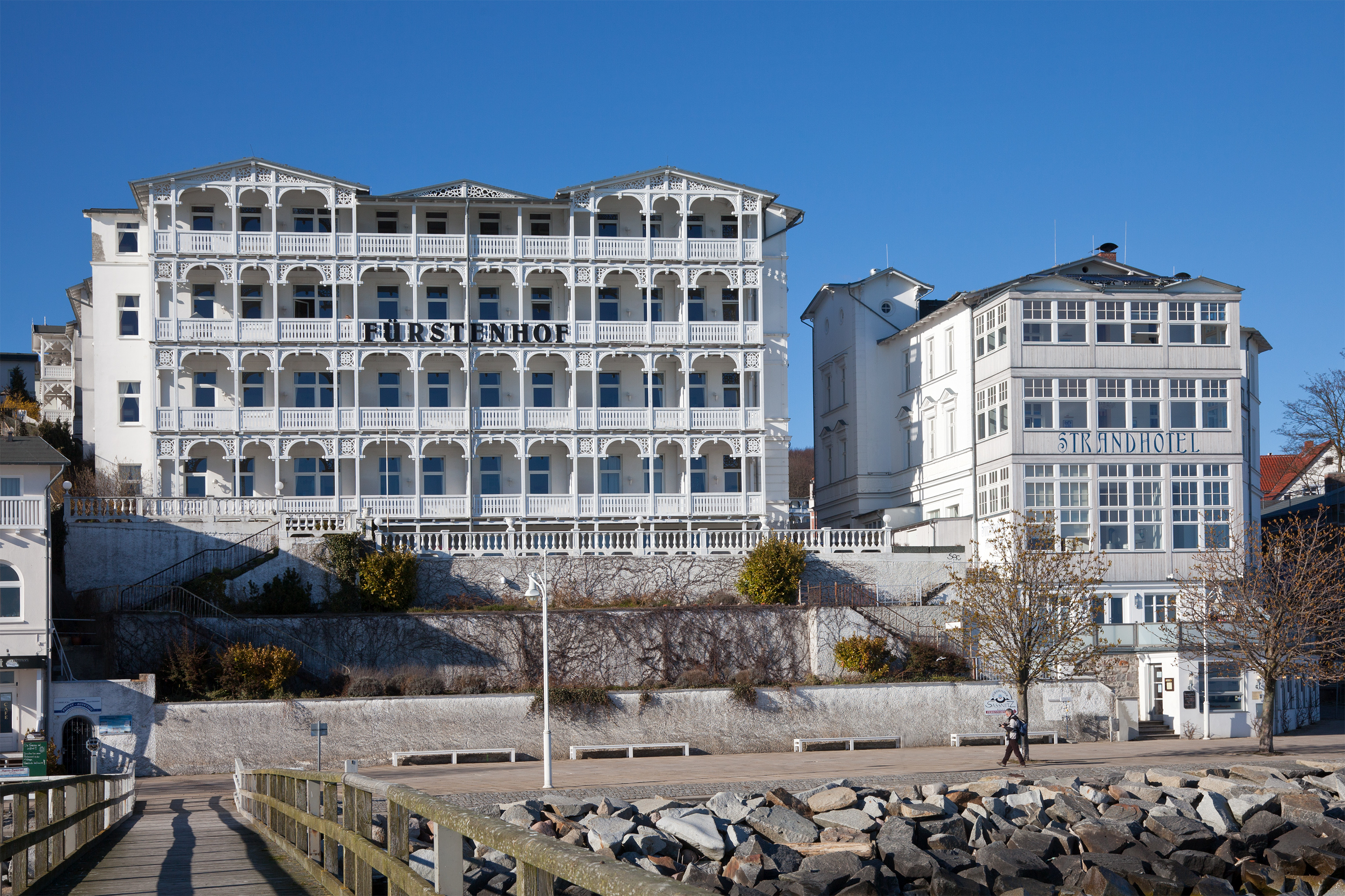
- Hotels at Sassnitz beach promenade (seen from the pier)

- Coat of arms

- Location of Sassnitz within Vorpommern-Rügen district
- Interactive map of Sassnitz
- Location within Germany Location within Mecklenburg-Vorpommern
- Coordinates: 54°30′59″N 13°38′28″E
- Country: Germany
- State: Mecklenburg-Vorpommern
- District: Vorpommern-Rügen

Government
  - Mayor: Leon Kräusche

Area
  - Total: 47.14 km^{2} (18.20 sq mi)
- Elevation: 30 m (98 ft)

Population (2025-12-31)
  - Total: 8,879
  - Density: 188.4/km^{2} (487.8/sq mi)
- Time zone: UTC+01:00 (CET)
  - Summer (DST): UTC+02:00 (CEST)
- Postal codes: 18546
- Dialling codes: +49(0)38392
- Vehicle registration: RÜG
- Website: www.sassnitz.de

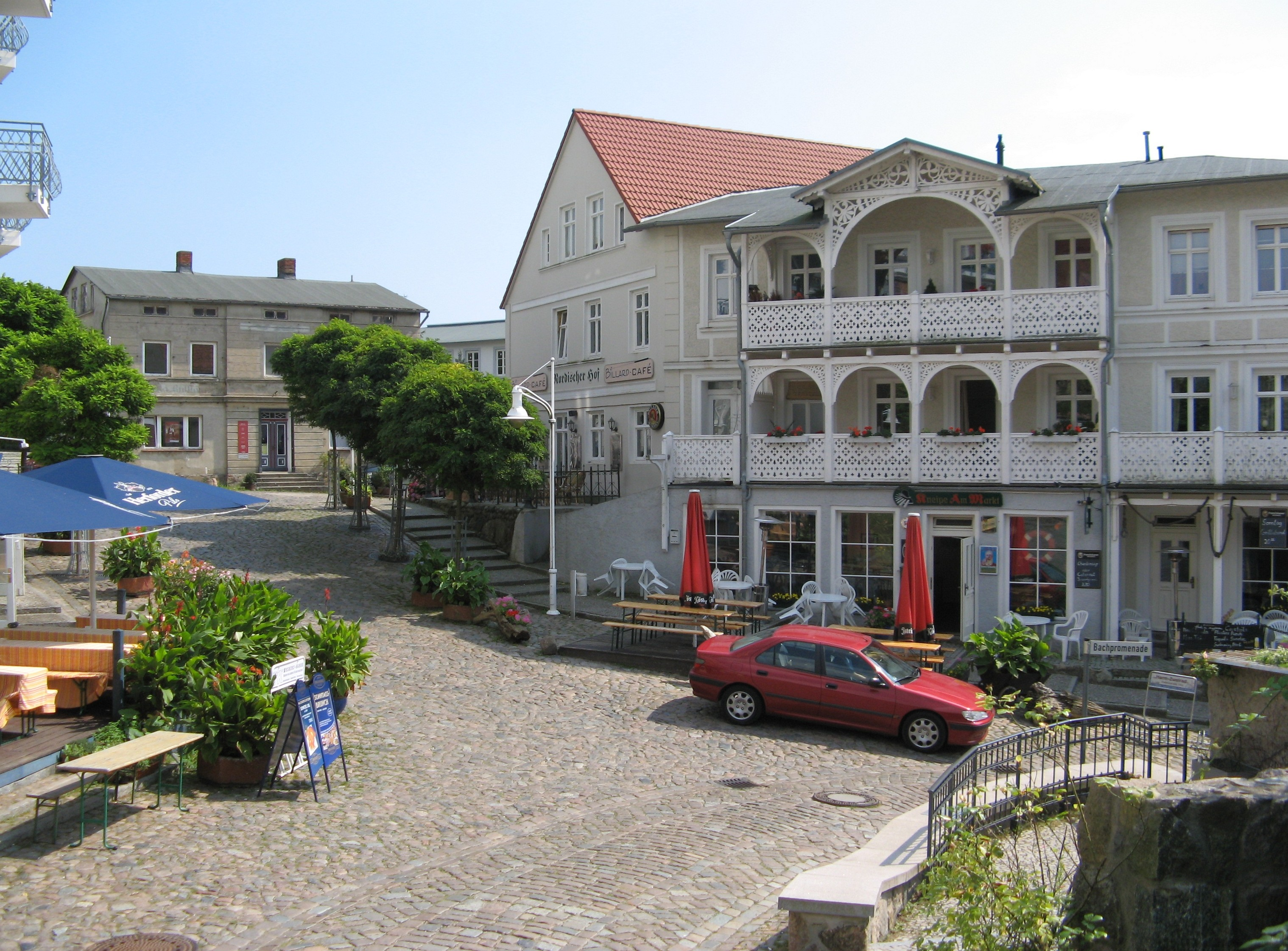
Old town center of Sassnitz

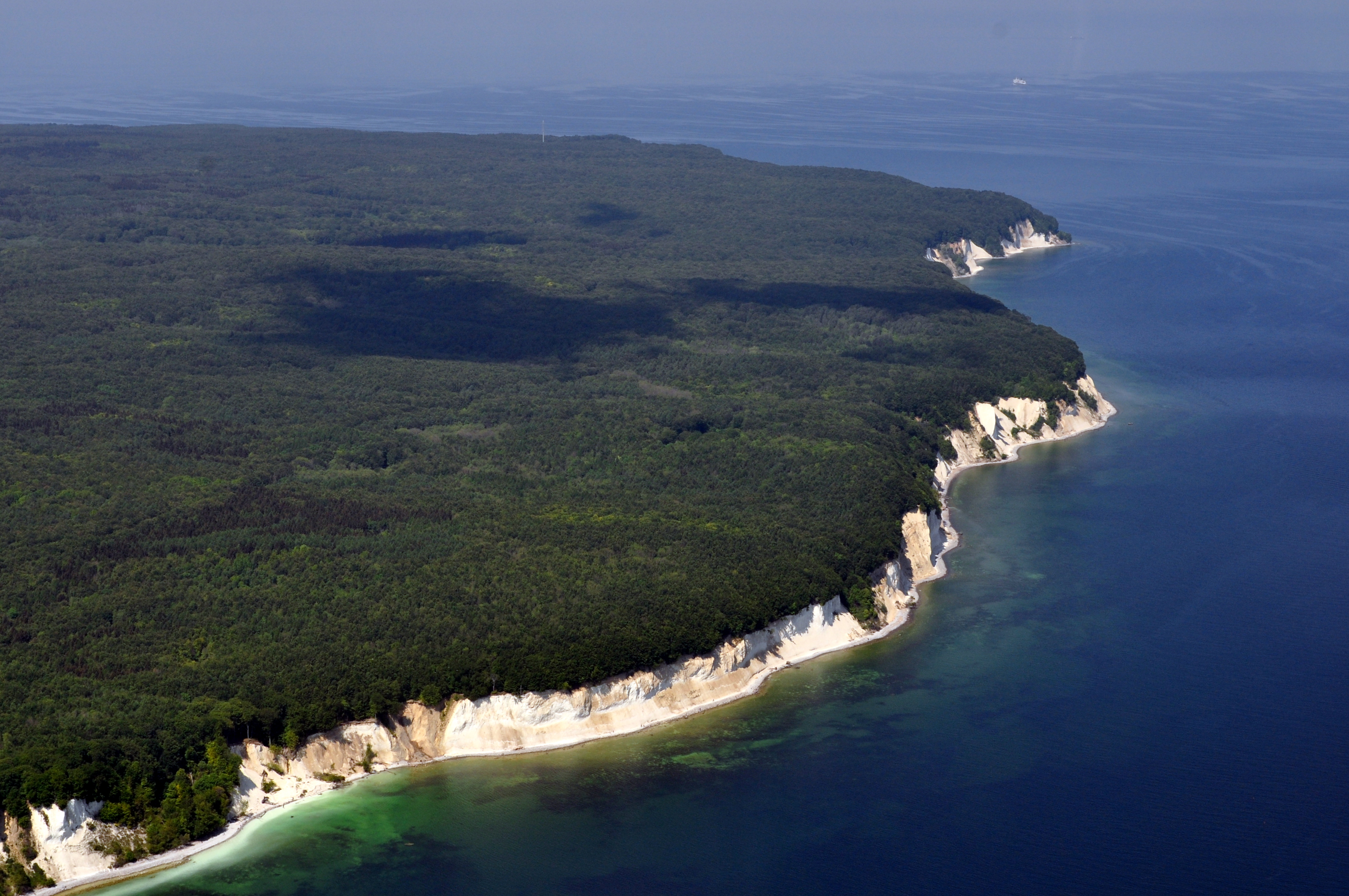
Cliff shoreline of Jasmund National Park

Sassnitz (German pronunciation: [ˈzasnɪts], before 1993 in German: Saßnitz) is a town on the Jasmund peninsula, Rügen Island, in the state of Mecklenburg-Vorpommern, Germany. The population as of 2012 was 9,498.

Sassnitz is a well-known seaside resort and port town, and is a gateway to the nearby Jasmund National Park with its unique chalk cliffs. The decommissioned British submarine HMS Otus was purchased by a German entrepreneur and towed to Sassnitz to be a floating museum. The Sassnitz area is most popular for its famous chalk rocks (Kreidefelsen), which inspired artists like Caspar David Friedrich.

== Geography ==
Scenery

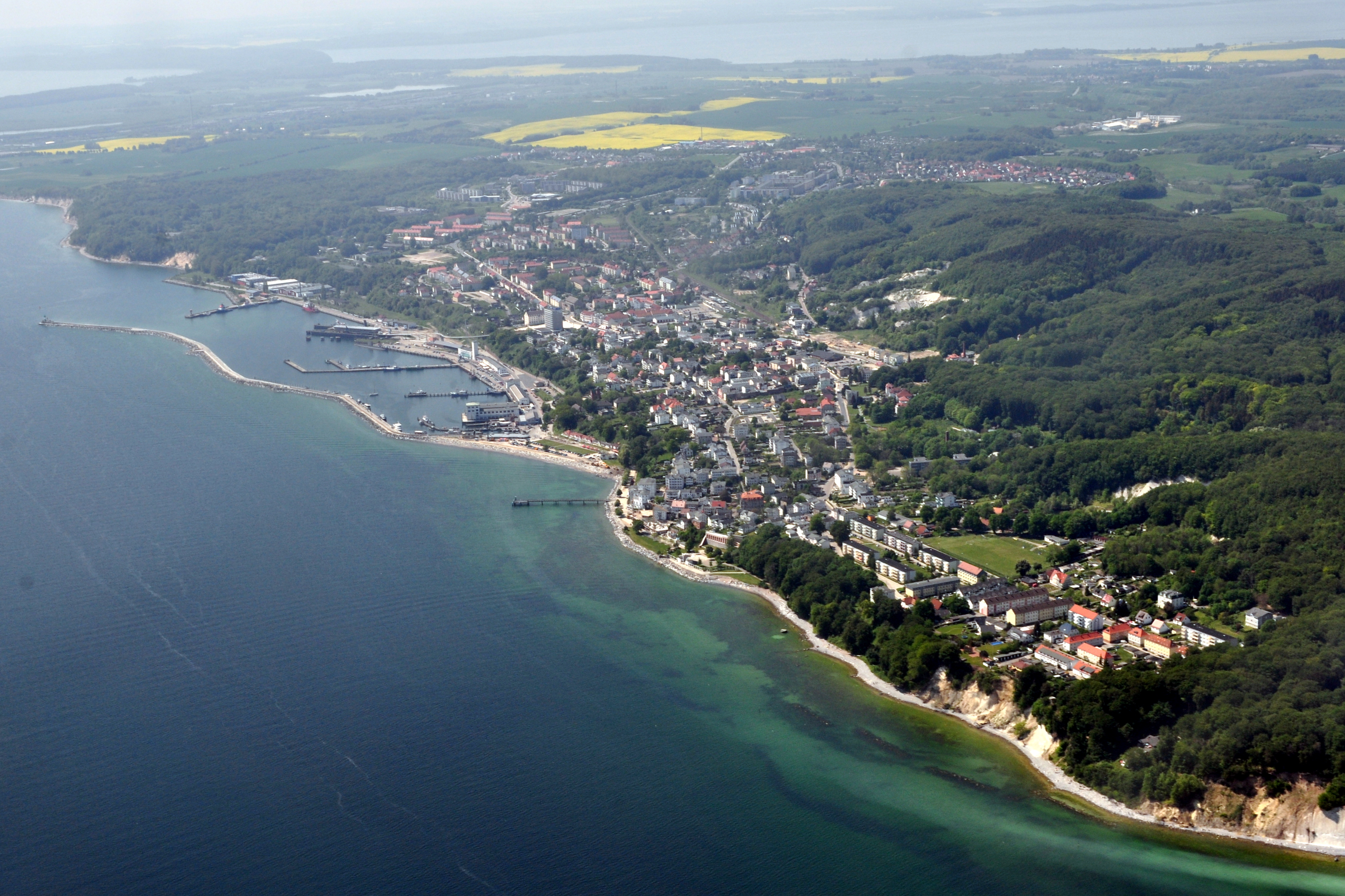
Sassnitz aerial view (2011), the famous chalk cliffs of the Jasmund National Park to the right. _{More aerial photos}

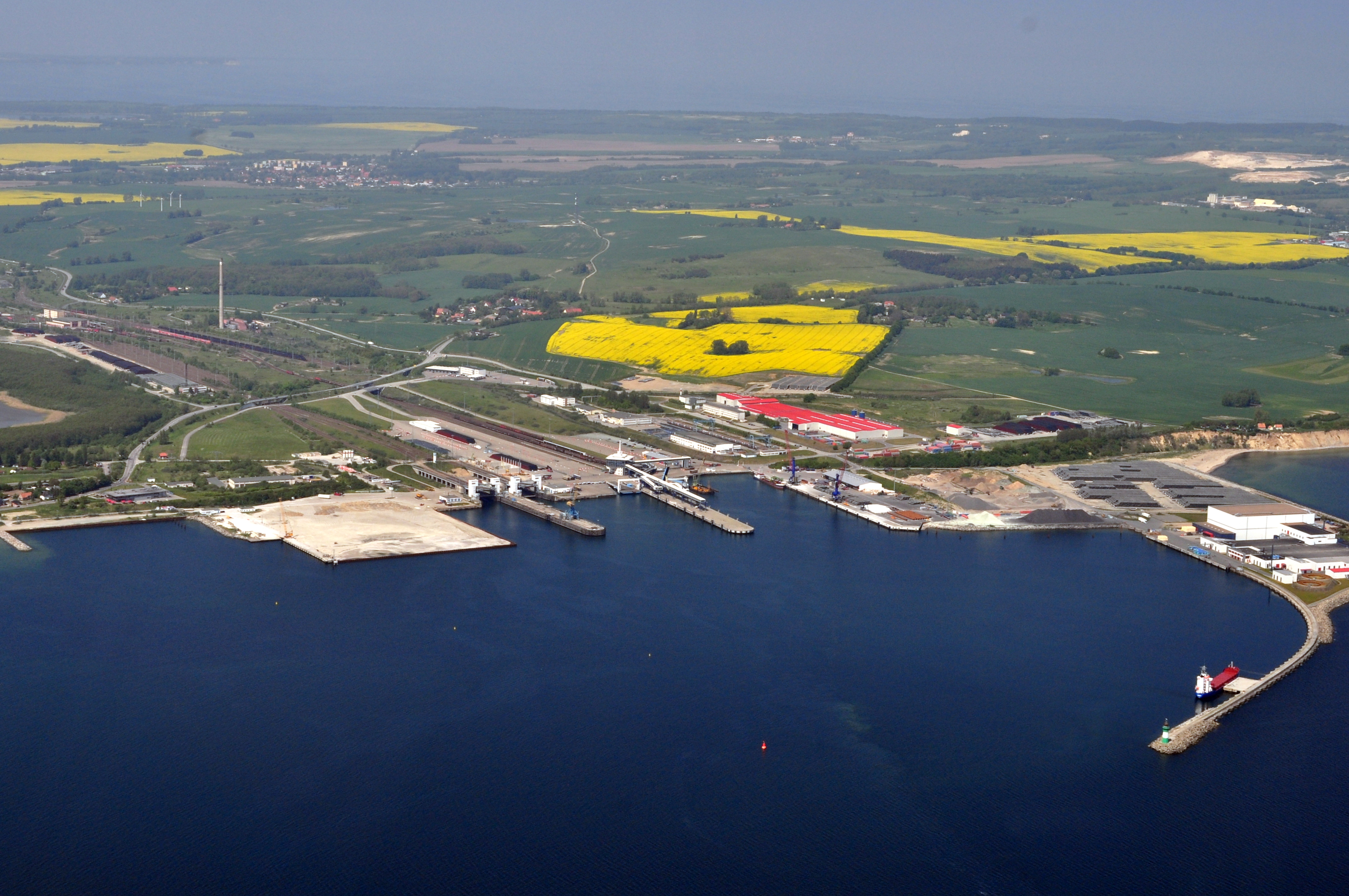
Sassnitz Mukran, the ferry port of Sassnitz

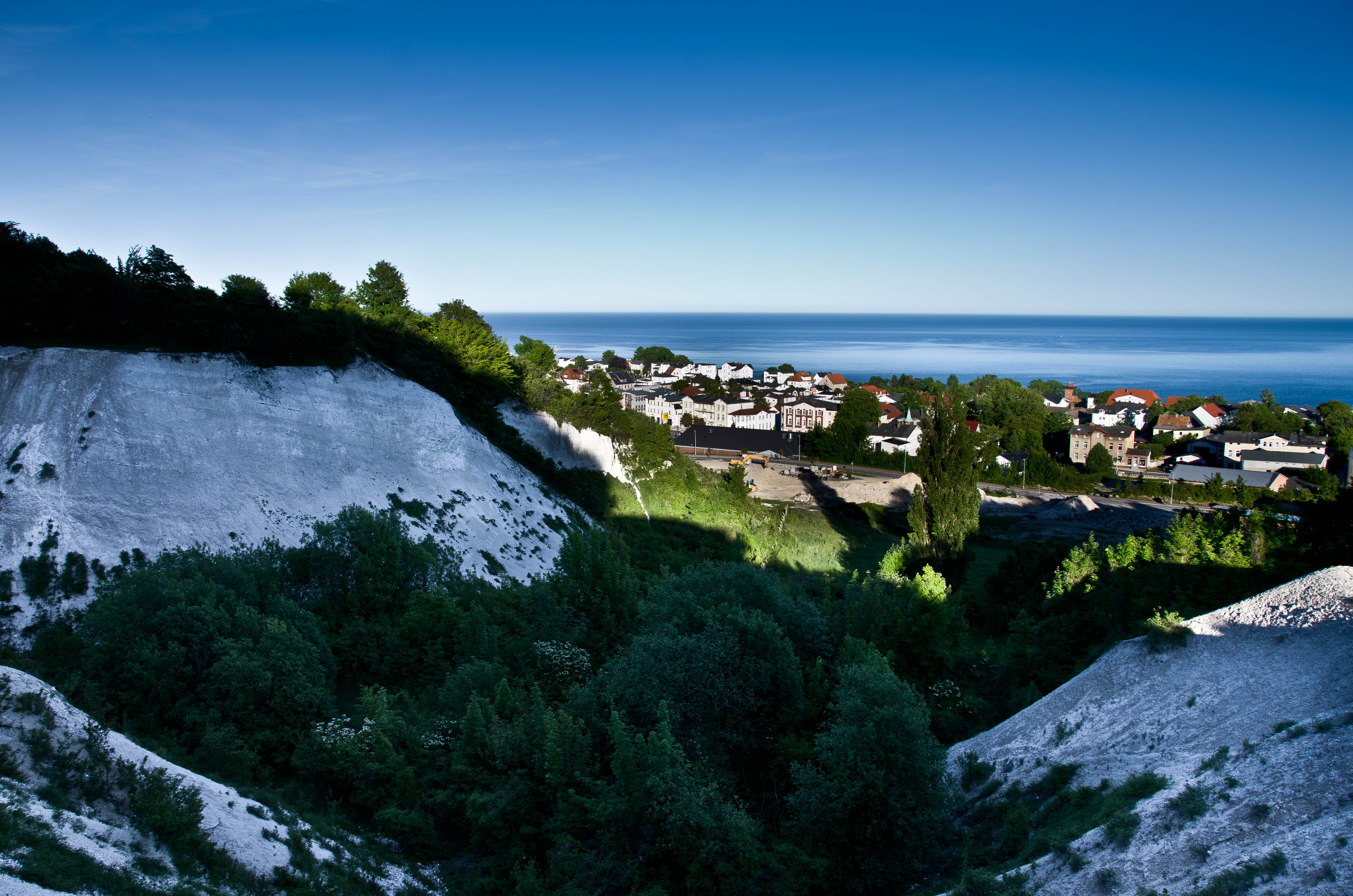
Chalk rocks in the front, spa town of Sassnitz in the back

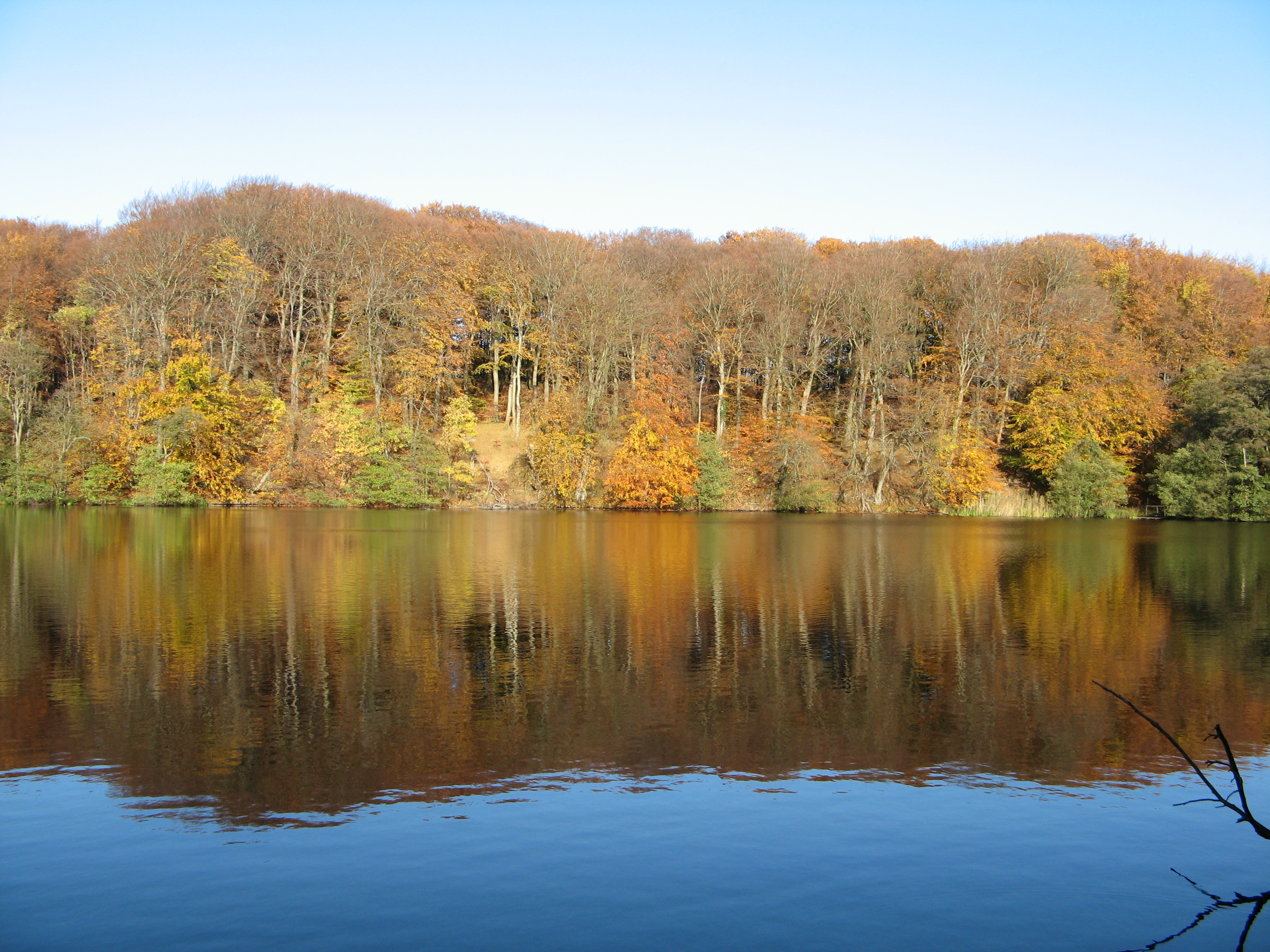
The small yet deep Herthasee in the national park as part of Sassnitz, with the Slavic hill fort Herthaburg at its banks

The borough of Sassnitz lies in the northeastern part of the island of Rügen, covering the eastern part of the Jasmund peninsula as far as the sand bar of Schmale Heide to the south. The countryside there is renowned especially for its chalk cliffs. In addition, ice age depositions dominate the landscape. Its depressions have frequently been filled by small lakes. The most striking chalk cliff is the 118-metre (387 ft)-high Königsstuhl. Large parts of the borough are covered by various types of trees with their typical habitats. One feature is the forest on the coastal slopes. Here there are rare trees like wild pear, wild apple, and yew. The town lies on the coastal slopes at the southern end of the Stubnitz, a 7.5-kilometre (4.7 mi)-long and up to 4-kilometre (2.5 mi)-wide beech forest. The remaining land areas consist of moors, beach, meadows, pastureland, and settlements. In the south of the borough, near Mukran, are the Wostevitz ponds, a boggy depression that is protected as a nature reserve. The small stream of Steinbach flows through the built-up area of the town.

Near the Königsstuhl lies another lake, the Herthasee, which has a diameter of about 150 metres (490 ft) and is up to 11 metres (36 ft) deep.

=== Subdivisions ===
The borough of Sassnitz is divided into the following municipalities: Blieschow, Buddenhagen, Dargast, Drosevitz, Dubnitz, Klementelvitz, Mukran, Neu Mukran, Rusewase, Sassnitz, Staphel, Stubbenkammer, Werder, and Wostevitz.

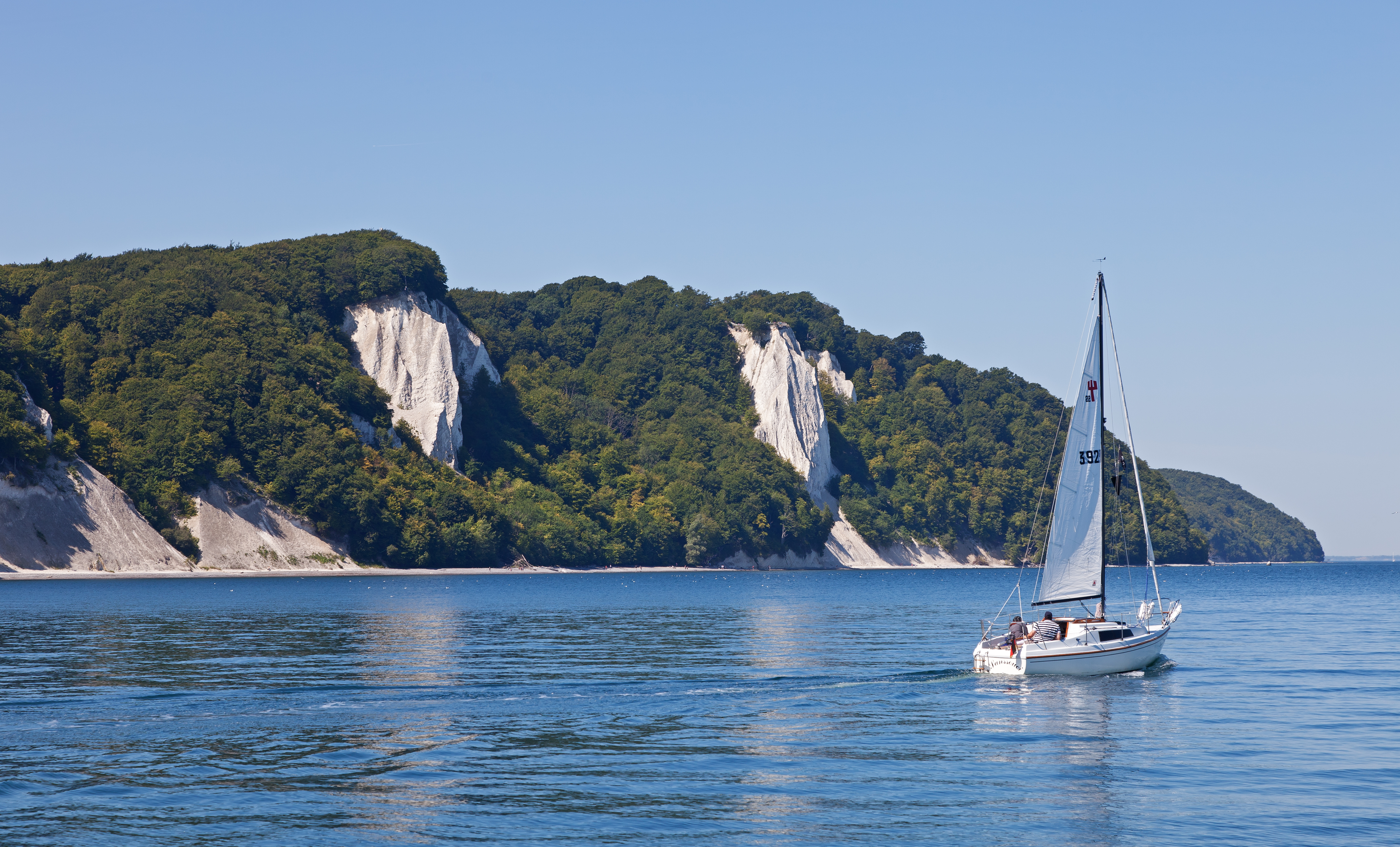
Parts of the chalk cliffs at Jasmund National Park: Victoria-Sicht (Victoria's View) and Königsstuhl (King's Chair), seen from the Baltic Sea

== Geology ==
The original landscape on the Jasmund is geologically very young. Its formation began with the end of the Weichselian glaciation about 12,000 years ago, when the ice sheet left behind there a Young Moraine landscape. As a result of thawing inland ice the underlying land and rose and hollows were filled with water. The predecessor to what later became the Baltic Sea, the Ancylus Lake, was formed.

Next, a cold steppe spread across the region. Later, birch and pine forests emerged, followed by oak forests. During the last 1,000 years, beech forests dominated the area. Lakes formed in the endorheic depressions, some of which silted up and became bogs. About 6,000 years ago, the sea level rose to its present level, leaving upland areas to form the Jasmund. As a result of the erosive action of waves and currents created, steep shores were formed that still characterise the landscape.

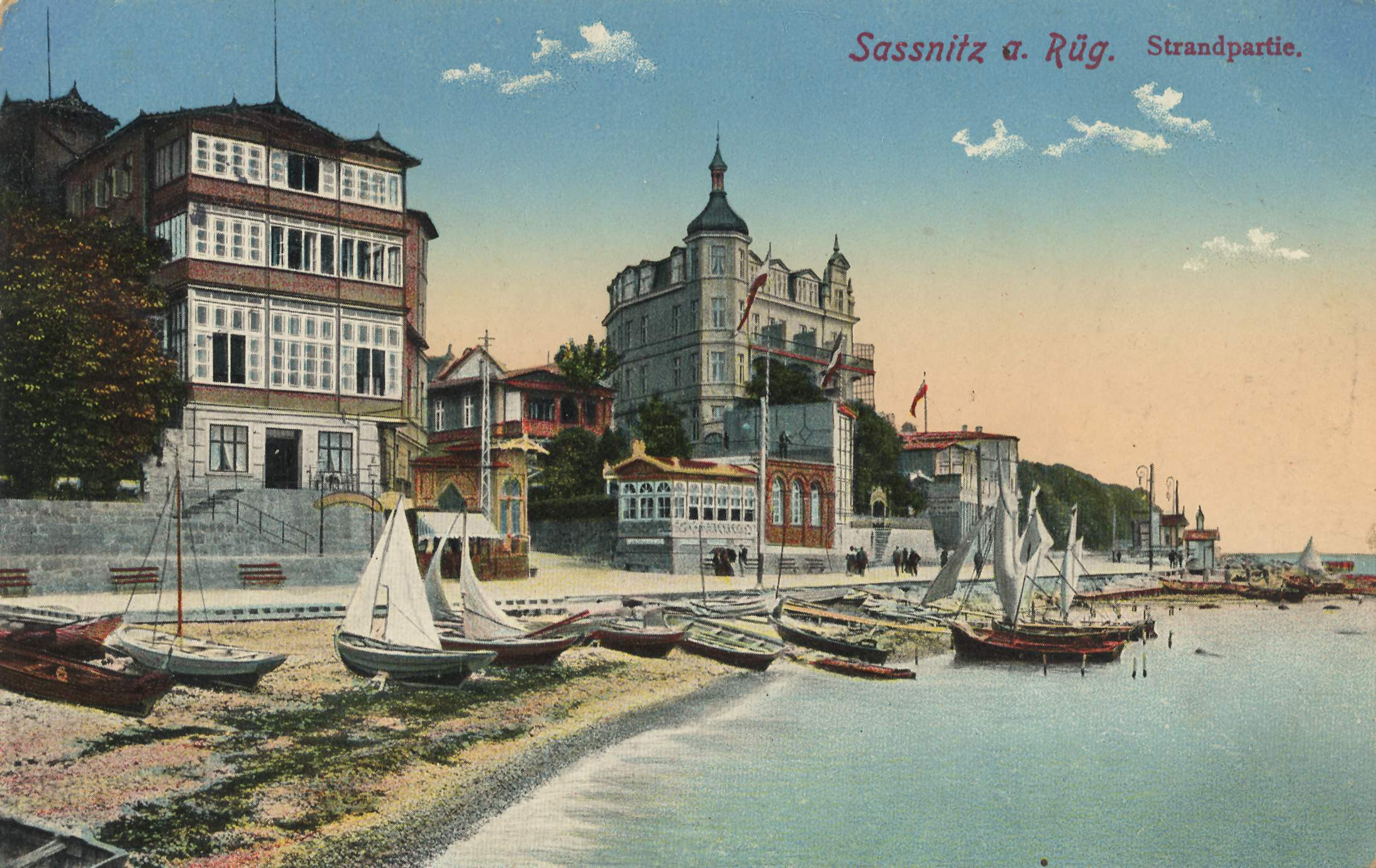
Historical postcard (1912) of the hilly shores lined with noble mansions, showing the typical resort architecture of German Baltic Sea resorts. _{More postcards}

== History ==
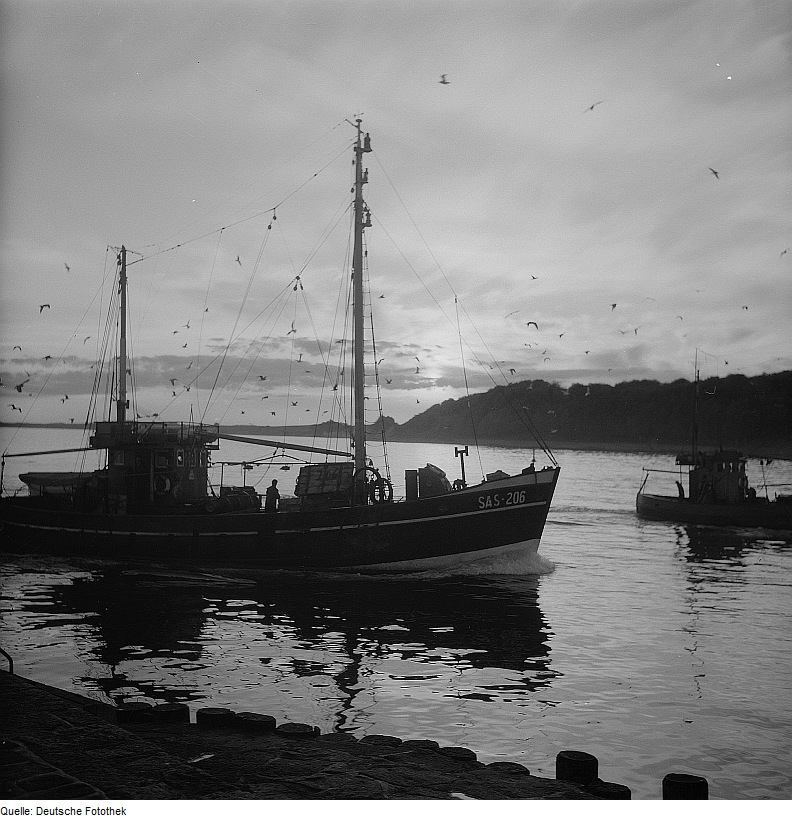
Fishing boat in the port, c. 1962

It was not until 1906 that the farming and fishing village of Crampas and the fishing village of Sassnitz were merged into the municipality of Sassnitz. Fishing was (and is) important. The desire of many city dwellers to relax by the sea led, at the end of the 19th century, to a rapid and strong growth on the shores of the Baltic and North Sea, as well as on Rügen itself. As early as 1824, it is recorded that the family of the Berlin theologian Friedrich Schleiermacher went on a beach holiday to Sassnitz.

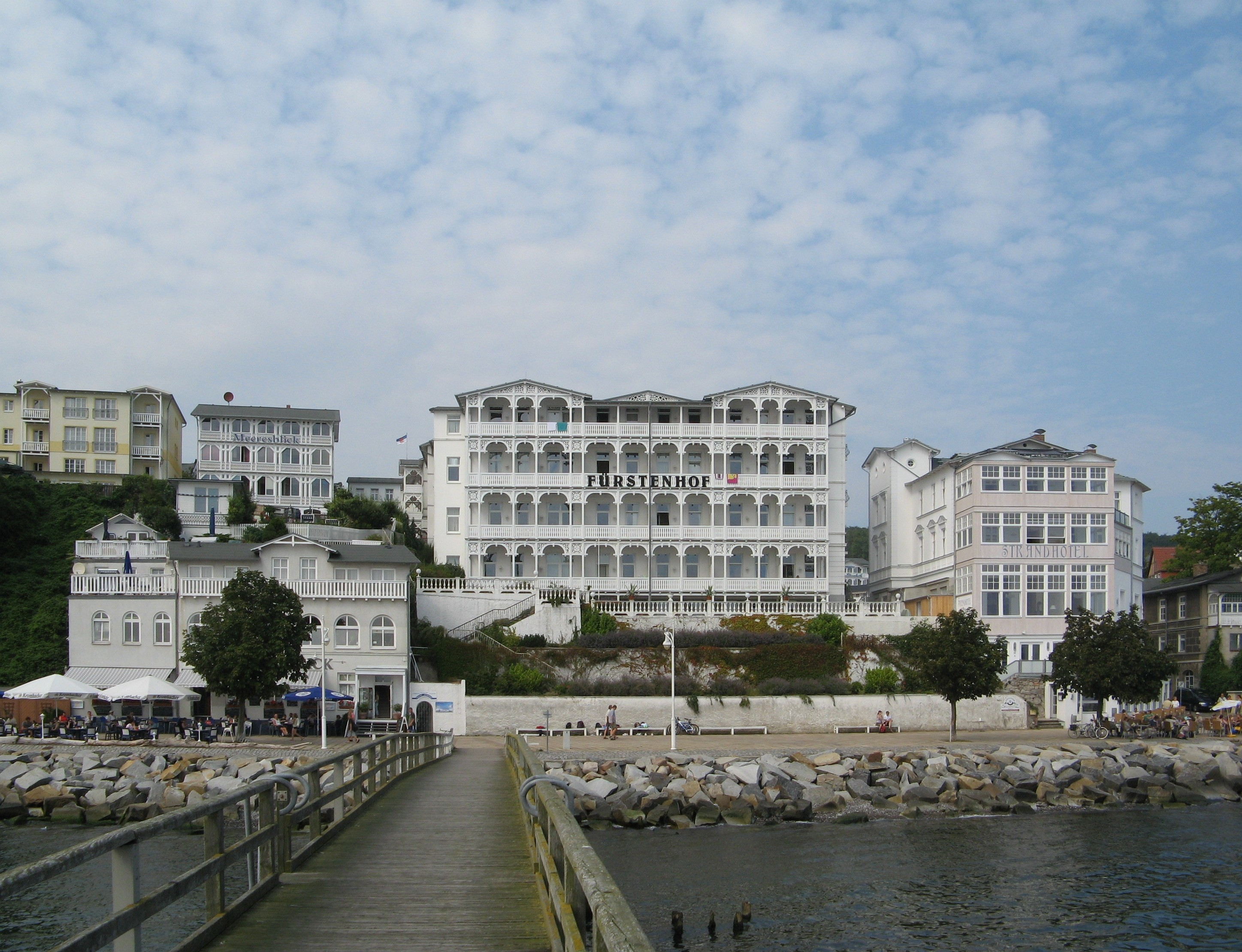
Nowadays: Posh historical hotels of the former upper class, including the 'Fürstenhof' (royal court) and 'Strandhotel' (beach hotel)

Theodor Fontane, in his book Effi Briest, named her lover, Major von Crampas, after the fishing village on Rügen. He also wrote about the Herthasee lake and coined the phrase in his book: "To travel to Rügen is to travel to Saßnitz." Johannes Brahms and Kaiser Wilhelm were other illustrious visitors to Sassnitz.

In 1871, the road to Sassnitz was upgraded, in 1891 the town was connected to the railway network from Bergen; in 1878 there was a boat service to Stettin; in 1889 to the port in Sassnitz and, soon thereafter, sea links to Rønne (Bornholm), Trelleborg and Memel (now Klaipėda). The new links enabled the place to grow rapidly. The chalk industry expanded, fish and now fish products as well characterised working life, and tourism grew, even though other places with beaches were better developed.

At the beginning of the 20th century, the beach promenade was built. The typical resort architecture with bed and breakfasts and hotels stamped the appearance of the place at this time. After establishing ferry and mailboat services Sassnitz also became an administrative centre with the appropriate new homes.

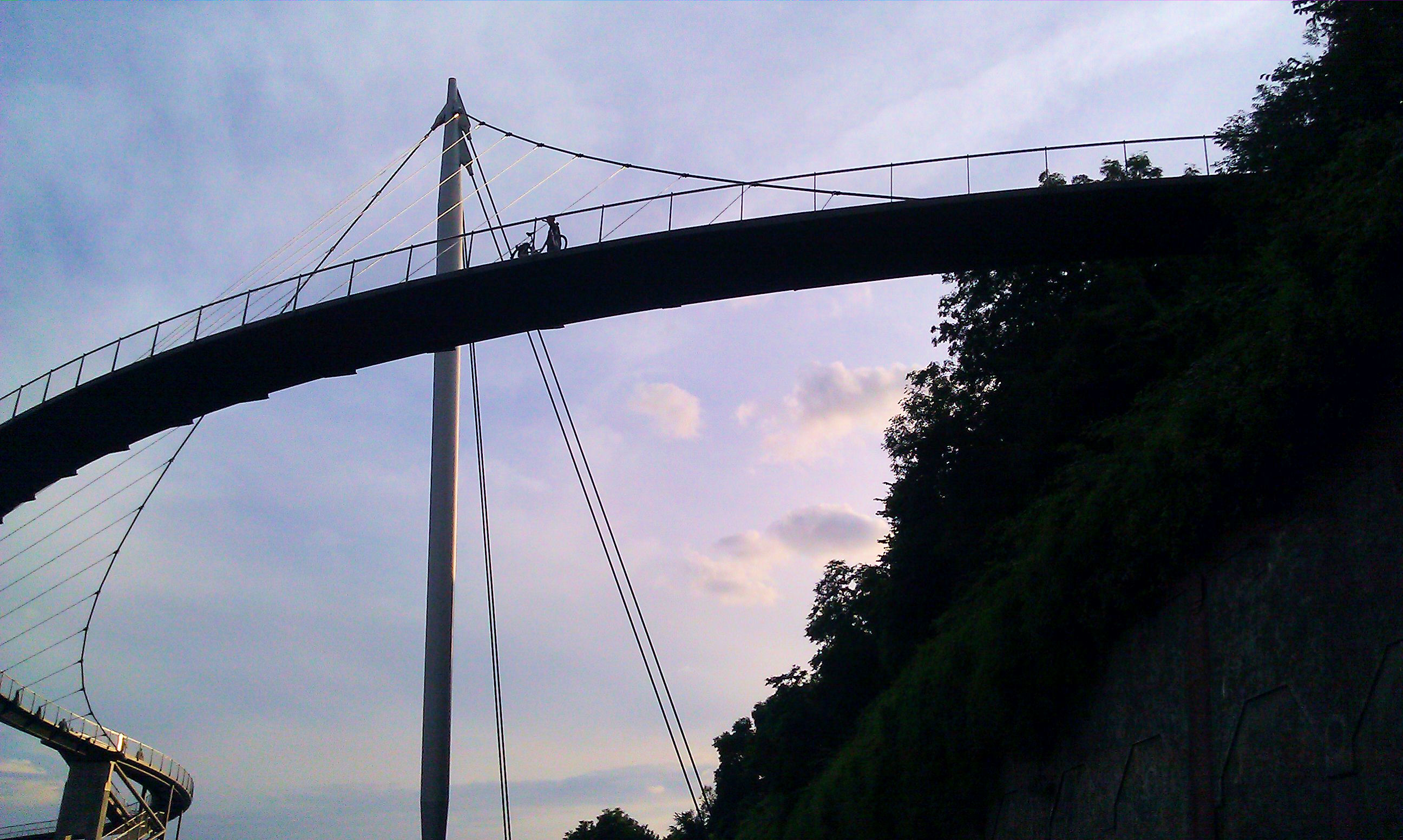
Suspension bridge to the port (for pedestrians)

Sassnitz was not given town rights until 1957. The fishing industry was expanded around that time; the B&B houses, however, fell increasingly into dilapidation. In 1984, a new port was built in the subdistrict of Mukran for the railway ferry between East Germany and the Soviet Union. After 1991, Sassnitz Ferry Port was rebuilt for services to the entire Baltic Sea region.

The official spelling of Sassnitz was "Saßnitz" until 2 February 1993. It was the spelling used in the letter of authority for town rights dated 23 November 1956.

From 1991, the historic town center was thoroughly renovated as part of the plan to promote urban development; the town's appearance improved considerably. The houses in the resort architecture style were renovated and most of them painted in a uniform white colour. The old town port was included in the municipal renovation plan in 2000.

In July 2007, a 274-metre-long (899 ft) suspension bridge for pedestrians was inaugurated, which links the center of Sassnitz between the station, Rügen Gallery, spa hotel and main street with the port of Sassnitz.

== Demographics ==
With its rise as a seaside resort and ferry port, the population of the municipality of Sassnitz grew steadily from 332 in 1885 to 3,987 in 1925 and 7,826 in 1939. The further expansion of Sassnitz, now elevated to the status of a town, as a ferry and fishing port in 1957, resulted in another sharp population increase (1971: 13,676; 1981: 14,944) Since the late 1980s, the population has again declined, however, to 11,985 in 1998 and 10,366 by end 2010.

== Politics ==
=== Town council ===
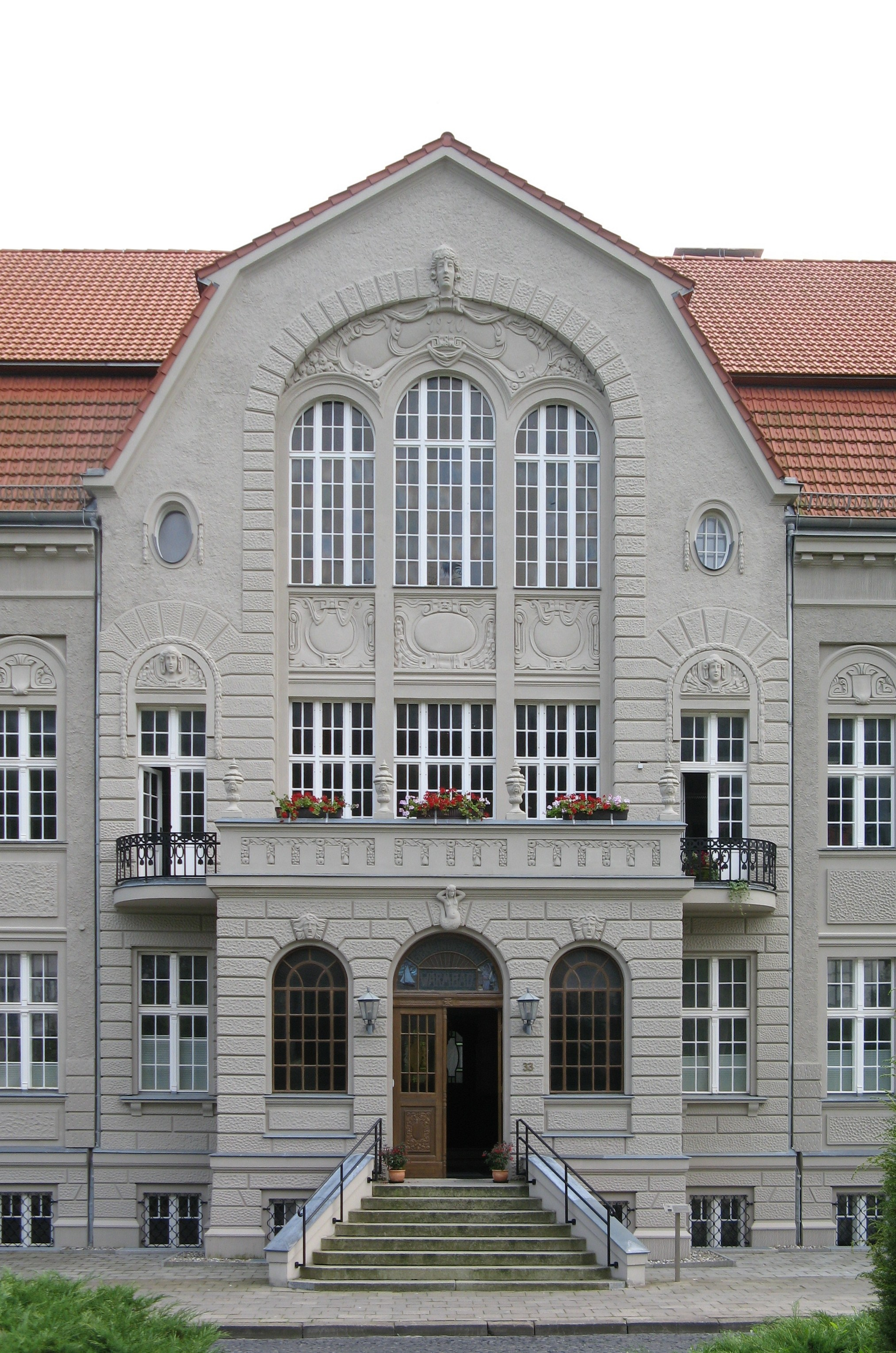
Town hall

The town council of Sassnitz consists of 25 councillors. The local elections of 7 June 2009 produced the following division of seats on the council:

- Die Linke: 11
- FDP: 5
- CDU: 4
- Alternative Freie Wählergemeinschaft (AFW): 2
- SPD: 2
- Independent: 1

=== Coat of arms ===
The coat of arms was adopted by the town council in 1959 and notified by a resolution of the town council on 1 November 1994. The emblem is registered under No. 17 in the Mecklenburg-Vorpommern coat of arms register.

Blazon: "The coat of arms shows a red and silver lighthouse on a blue field emitted silver beams of light. It rises from a gap in the top row of a red, brick wall with silver mortar".

=== Flag ===
The town flag has three vertical stripes: blue, white and blue. The blue stripes occupy two ninths of the flag height. The white stripe take up five ninths of the height and is emblazoned in the centre with the town's coat of arms. The ratio of the height of the coat of arms to the height of the bunting is 4:9. The ratio of height to length of the flag is 3:5.

== Twin towns – sister cities ==
Sassnitz is twinned with:

- Cuxhaven, Germany
- Huai'an, China
- Kingisepp, Russia
- Klaipėda, Lithuania
- Port Washington, United States
- Trelleborg, Sweden

== Culture and sights ==
The town of Sassnitz is the most important tourist destination in the Jasmund National Park, Germany's smallest national park by area. The Königsstuhl is the top tourist magnet in the park. At 118 metres (387 ft), it is also the highest point on the chalk cliffs in the national park.

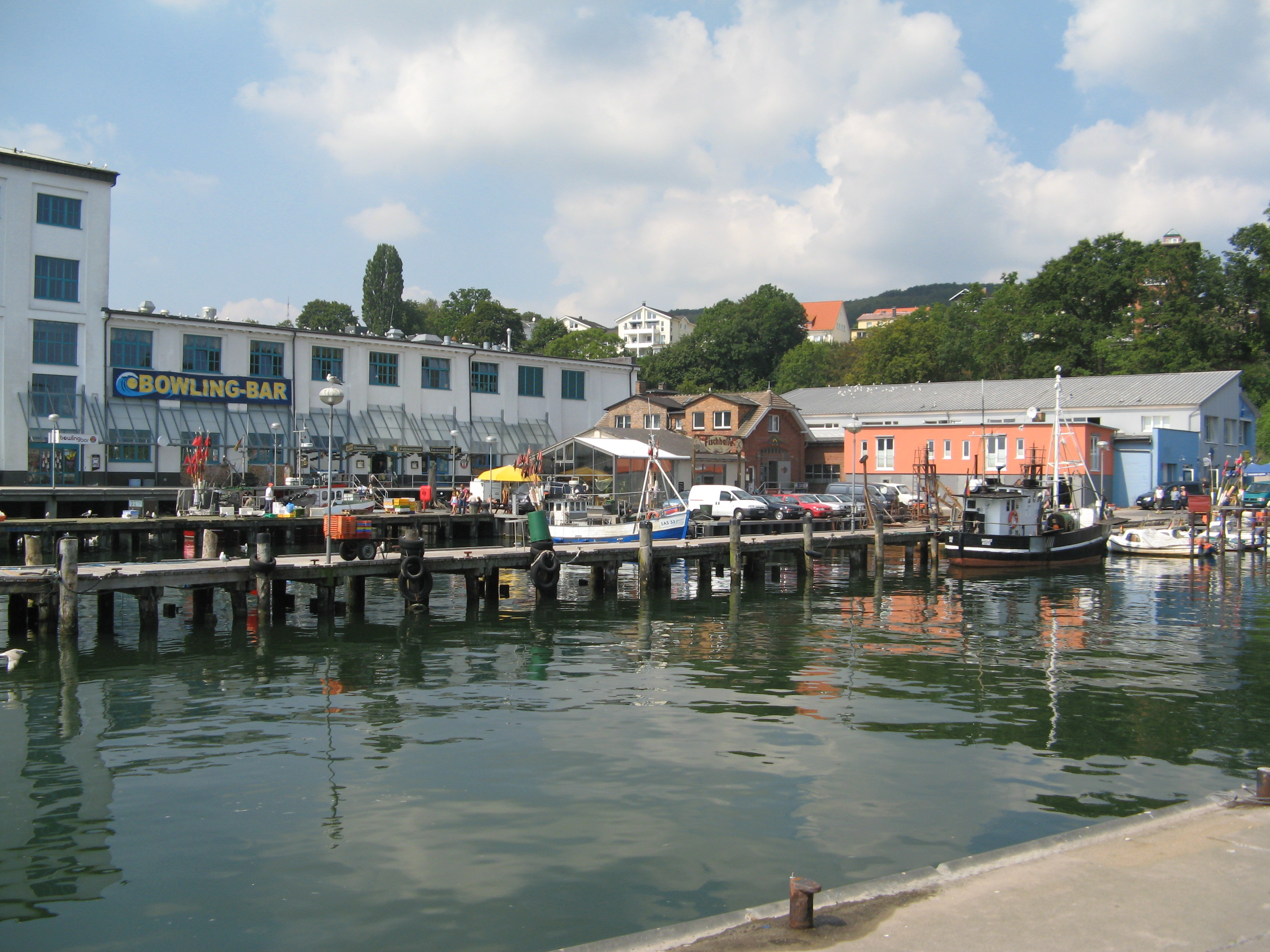
Old fishing port

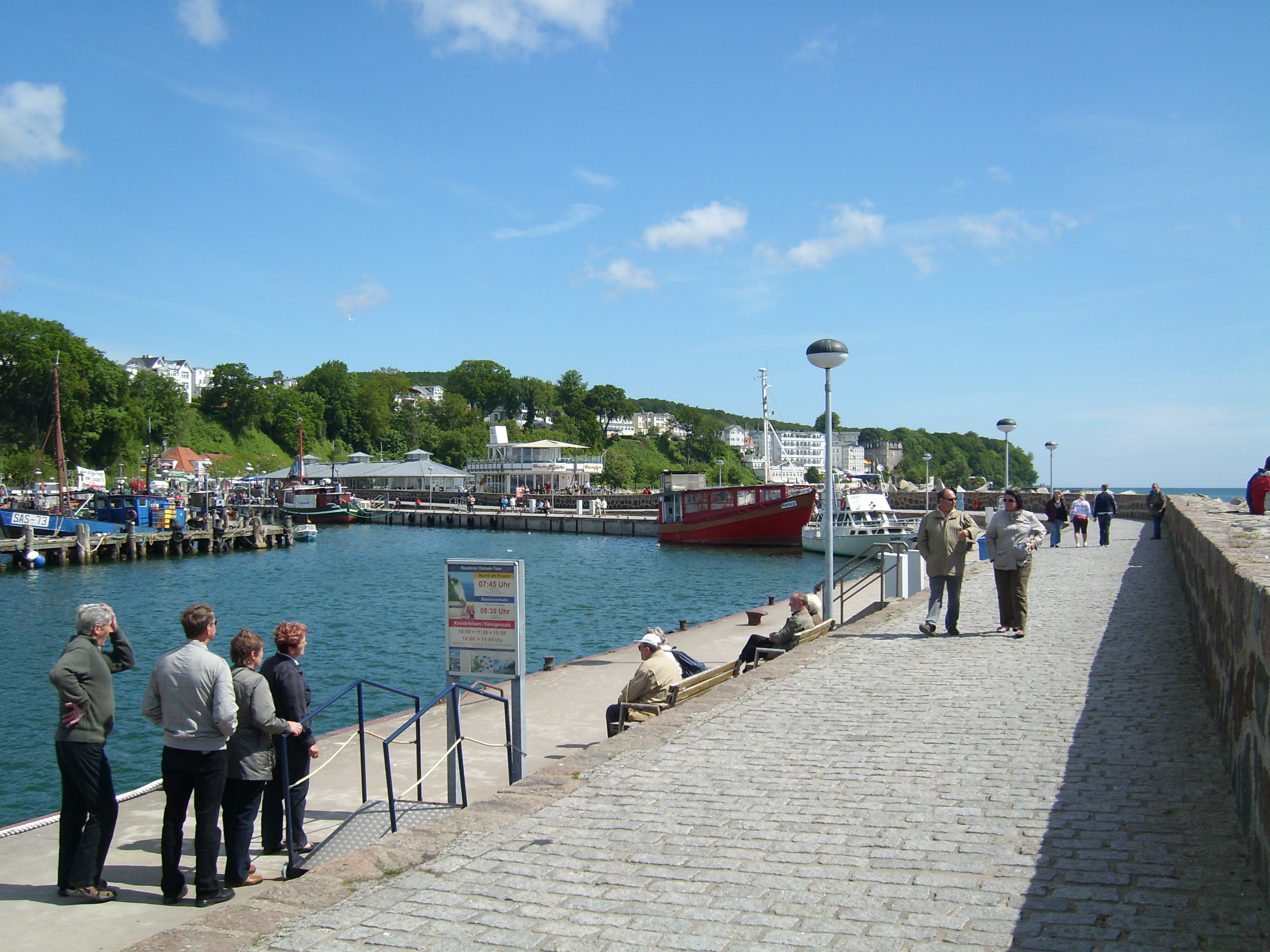
On the breakwater wall of the old Sassnitz harbour

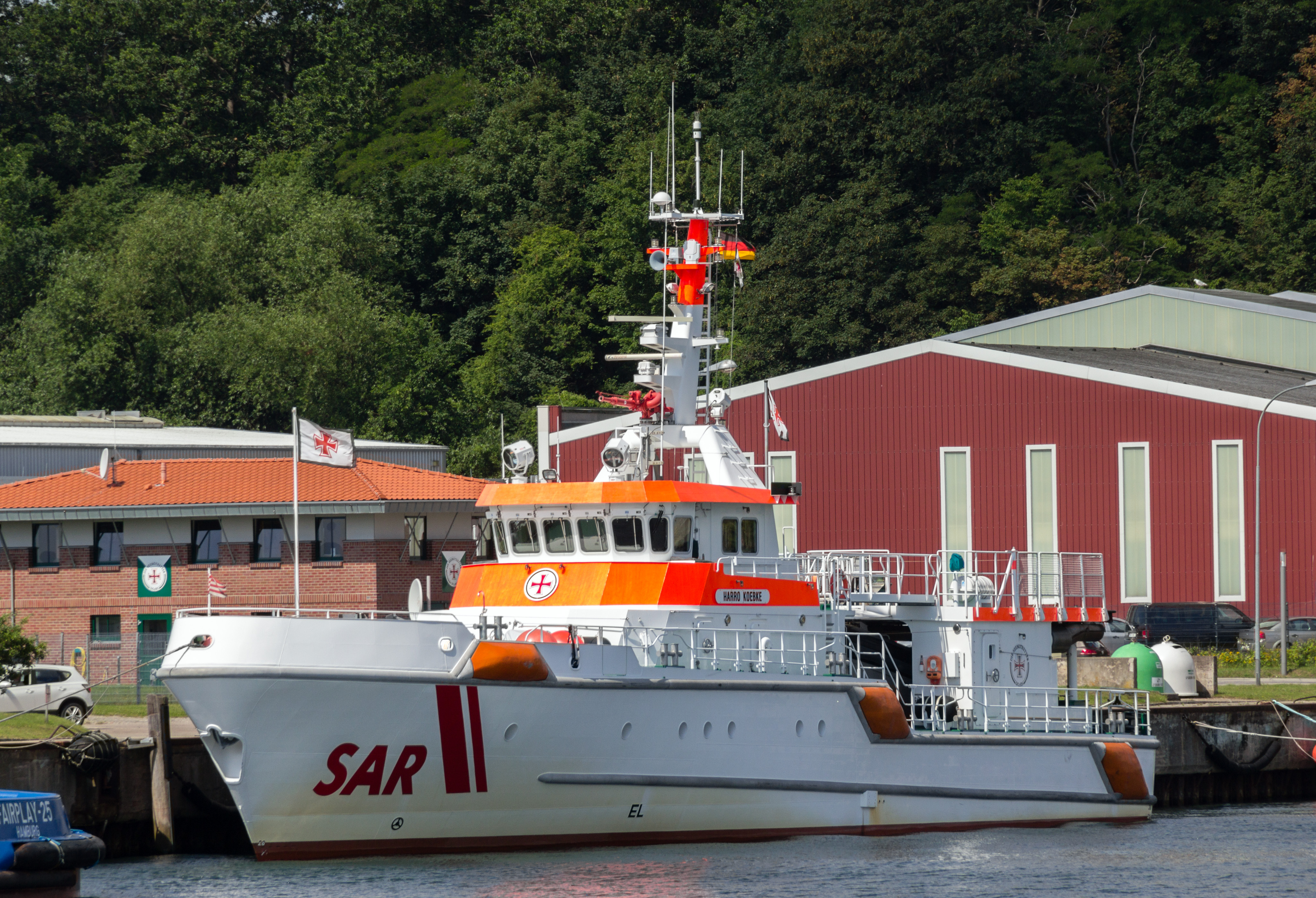
DGzRS search and rescue cruiser Harro Koebke (SK32) at SAR-station Sassnitz

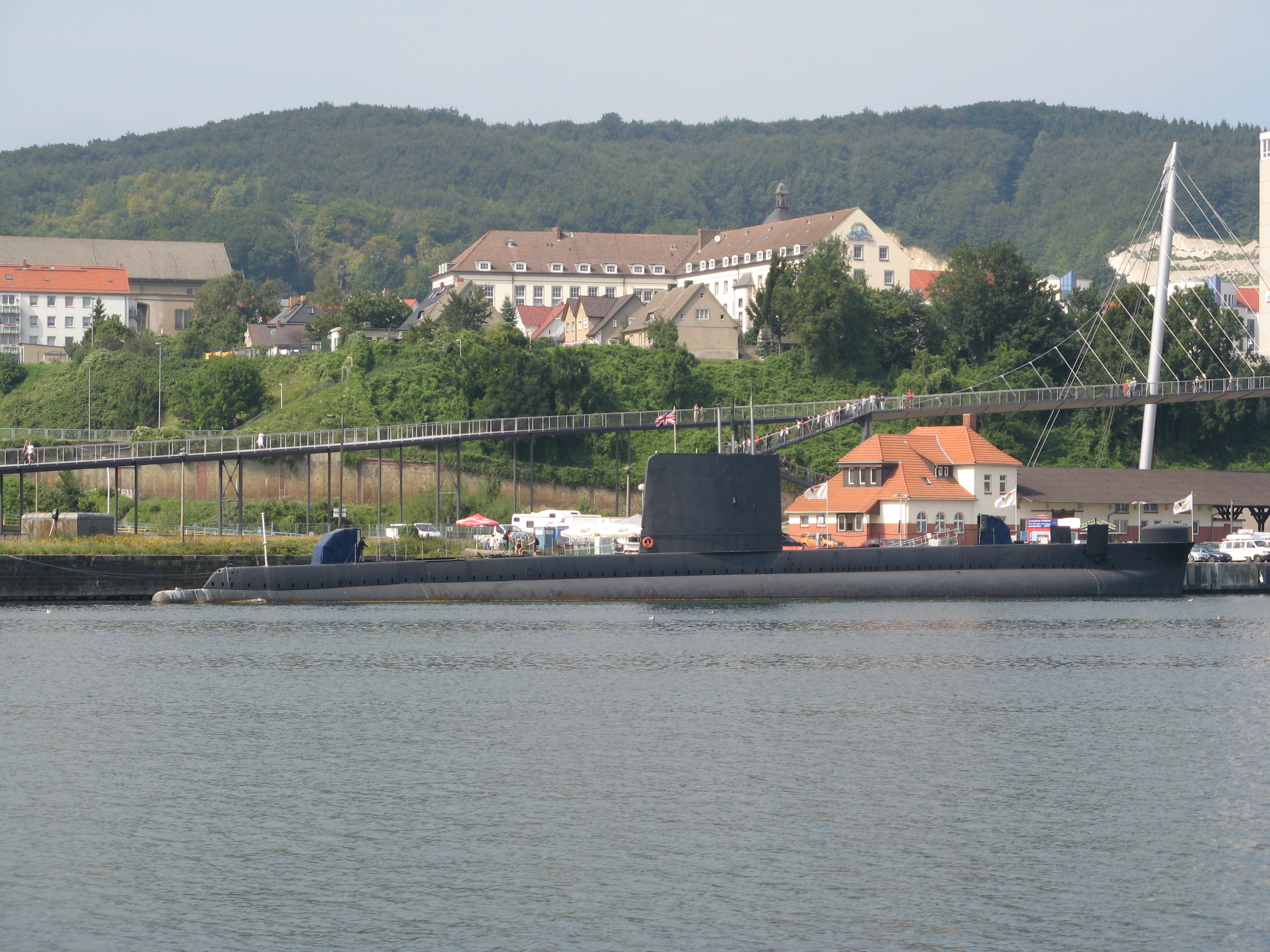
HMS Otus submarine in Sassnitz Harbour

Since March 2004, the national park has had a national park centre at Königsstuhl, which has two exhibitions offering visitors an insight into the natural world, the chalk, the Baltic Sea and the beech forests of the park.

On the edge of the Jasmund National Park lies Sassnitz Wildlife Park, the only one of its kind on the island of Rügen. The Gummanz Chalk Museum (Kreidemuseum Gummanz), the only chalk museum in Europe, lies not far from Sassnitz near Sagard on the terrain of an old chalk pit, worked from 1855 to 1962, and uses an open-air area with original implements as well as photographic and textual information boards, that describe the geological relationships, the mining and working of chalk on Rügen. In summer there is a regular briefing on archaeological discoveries for fossil collectors.

=== Harbour area ===
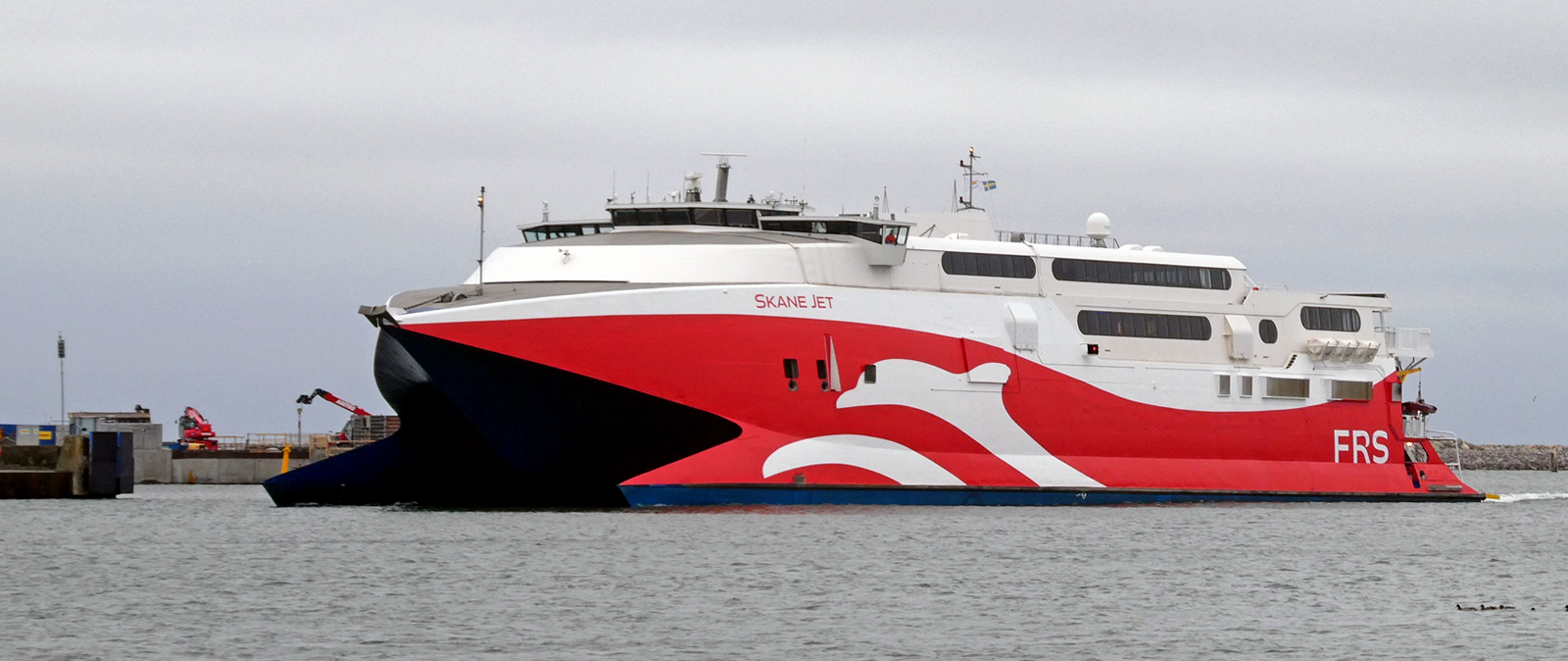
Skane Jet operates the Sassnitz - Ystad route from autumn 2020.

The "glass station" has lost its function as a result of the expansion of the new Sassnitz Ferry Port and today houses an exhibition and events hall as well as the Museum for Underwaterarchaeology. Here there are several exhibits of the Ralswiek boat discovery.

The Fishing and Harbour Museum documents the history of fishing on Rügen and the old Sassnitz harbour. Amongst the exhibits is the Havel fishing smack (Fischcutter). In the harbour, as well as excursion and fishing boats, is the British submarine HMS Otus, a museum piece, as is the coastal sailing cargo boat, Annemarie, which was converted in 2007 into a passenger boat.

The Alaris Butterfly Park in Sassnitz has been open since July 2003. The park is home to hundreds of free-flying butterflies in a tropical environment.

Since 2000, the club Lichtspiele has run a programme of revival house films in the Grundtvighaus.

The E-WERK youth project sees itself as a centre for ideas and projects aimed at testing and implementing meaningful and welfare-oriented jobs in the main labour market for socially disadvantaged youth and young adults. In 1995 the "Sassnitz Company" was launched to provide a lasting social network for the Rügen region. From one hundred-year-old Sassnitz power station a youth, culture, services and events centre was built with an event hall, an accommodation block, a youth hostel floor, and much more.

The municipal and evangelical church community centre at Gerhart-Hauptmann-Ring 50, founded in February 2000 as a meeting place for older people, has now merged with various other projects, such as the "Kiek in" cafe, the Spinnstube, the Klönstube of CJD Garz, the Klönclub, the clothes market, various self-help groups (Alcoholics Anonymous, etc.), ESV Sassnitz (weight training for everyone) and the church youth club, Saskia.

Cultural groups include De Jasmunder Plattdänzer, a folk dance group of girls and boys (aged 6–18), the Sassnitz youth brass band, the Sassnitz People's Choir, formed in 1964, and the Sassnitz Carnival Club, founded in 1975.

=== Buildings ===
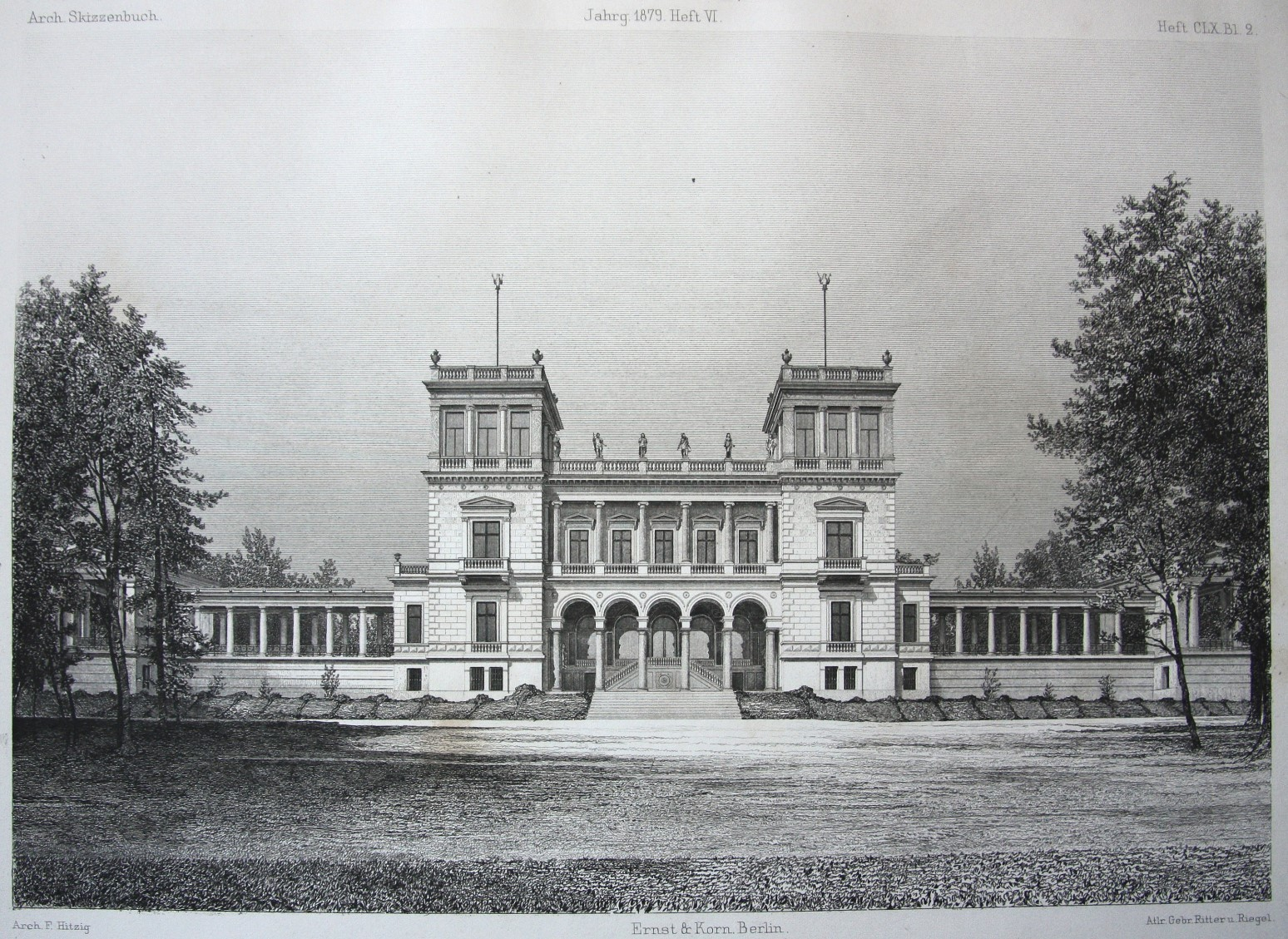
Dwasieden Castle, drawing from 1879

- Sassnitz has the longest outer mole in Europe with a length of 1,450 metres (1,590 yd). Construction started in 1889 and it was finally completed in 1912.
- The present town hall was designed by Berlin architect, Gustav Bähr, and opened in 1910 as a heated baths and community centre for members of the united parish of Sassnitz. On the main entrance a picturesque glass mural recalls its former function as a public bath.
- On the edge of the Dwasieden Forest is the old people's centre of the Workers' Welfare Association (AWO). It consists of a nursing home, and managed apartments with flats for the elderly and disabled, which were completed in 2005. In collaboration with artists, a sensory garden was created. In it there is a trail along which people with dementia can move freely without getting lost.
- The "Glass Station" (Glasbahnhof) and ferry terminal at the port of Sassnitz recall the over 100-year tradition of ferry services to Sweden and Northern Europe.
- Sassnitz's old town is near the town hall. In Karlstraße is the oldest house in Sassnitz, clearly visible from its blue and white exterior. Because of their architecture, Haus Seerose (Ringstraße 5) and Villa Hertha are worth seeing.
- The Evangelical St. John's Church stands on a hill between Sassnitz and Crampas on Stubbenkammerstraße. Its construction was begun in 1880 to plans by city architect Adolf Gerstenberg from Berlin. Its inauguration took place three years later.
- The 274-metre-long suspension bridge that, since 2007, has connected the town centre, between the railway station, Rügen Gallery, the spa hotel and the high street, to the port of Sassnitz.
- Dwasieden Castle is set in a park in the Dwasieden Forest. Its ruins give an idea of the varied history of this once magnificent building. The top Aachen banker, Adolph von Hansemann purchased the property in the mid-19th century from Baron Eduard von Barnekow. The mansion was built in 1873–1876 following a concept by Friedrich Hitzig in Italian Neo-Renaissance style. In 1947 the building was blown up at the order of the GDR government, only parts of the one-storey arcade wings survived. In 2007, there were plans to rebuild the castle in a historically incorrect way and to extend it to a 'spa town' with 3,000 beds. Fortunately, in the eyes of many, these plans were abandoned and a more sensitive plan for a faithful reconstruction of the castle and a gentle extension are prepared.

In Dwasieden Forest there also is a grave mound.

==== Gallery ====
Sassnitz buildings

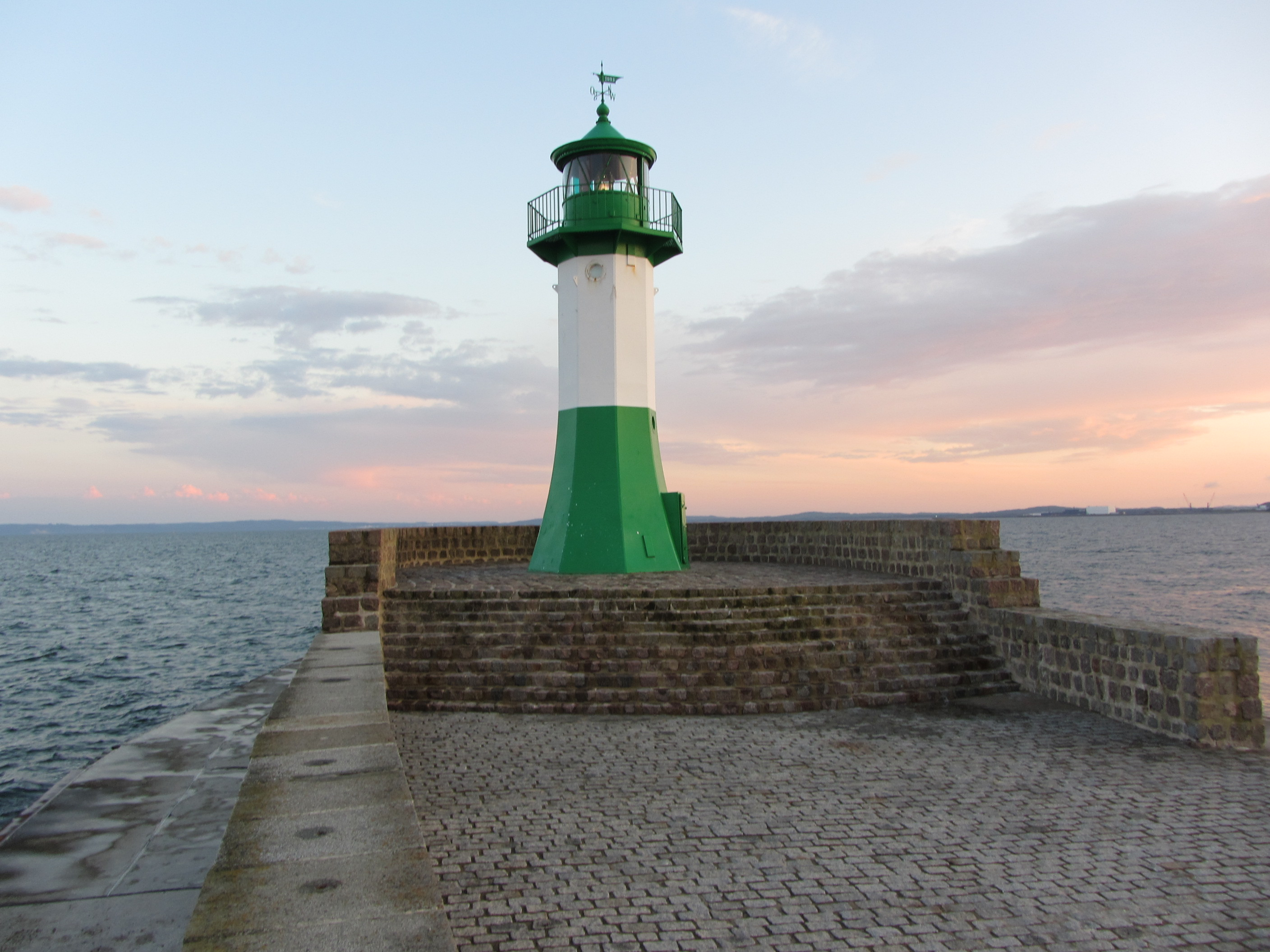
Sassnitz Breakwater Light

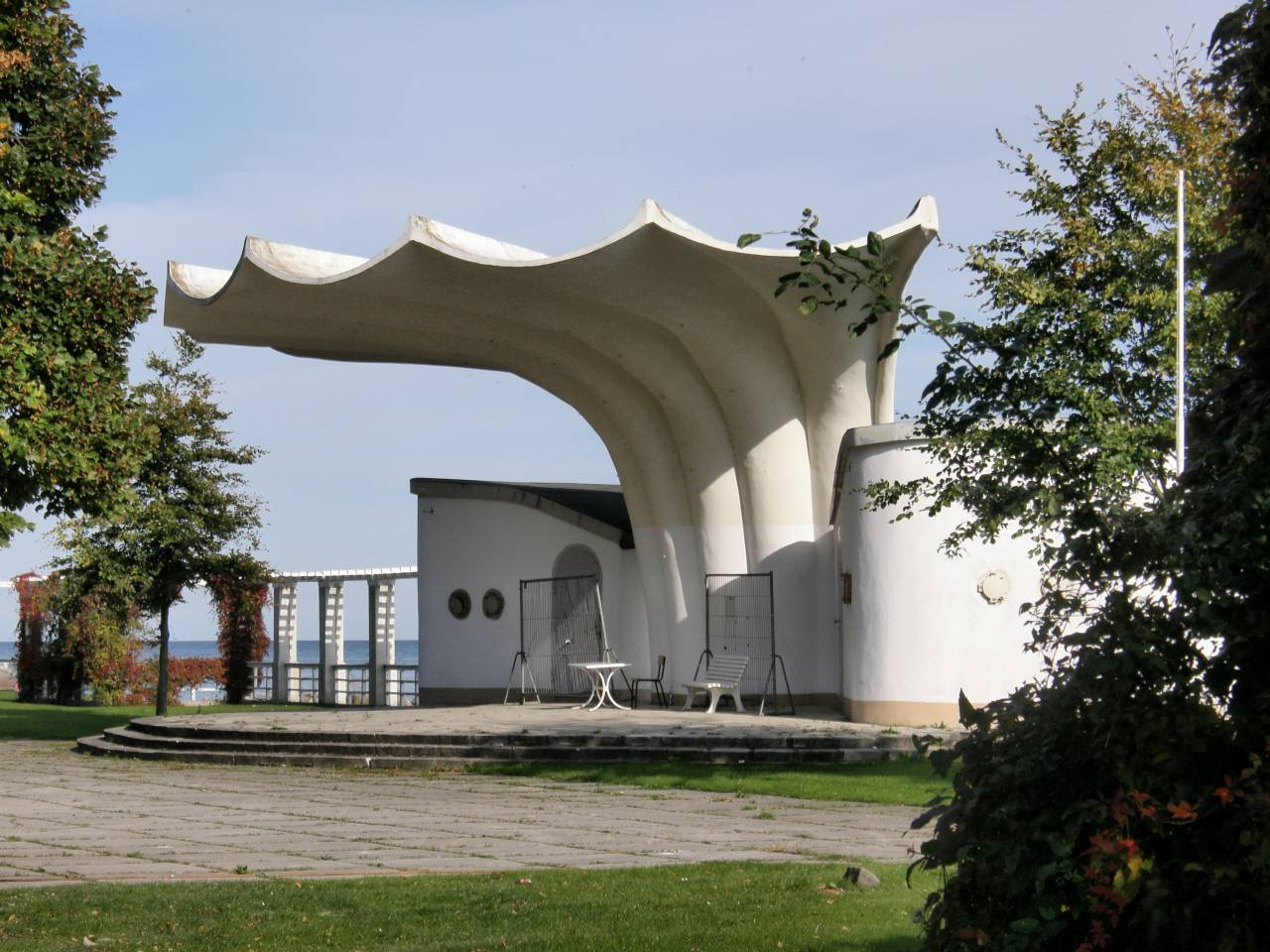
Concert pavilion of Sassnitz, shaped like a shell

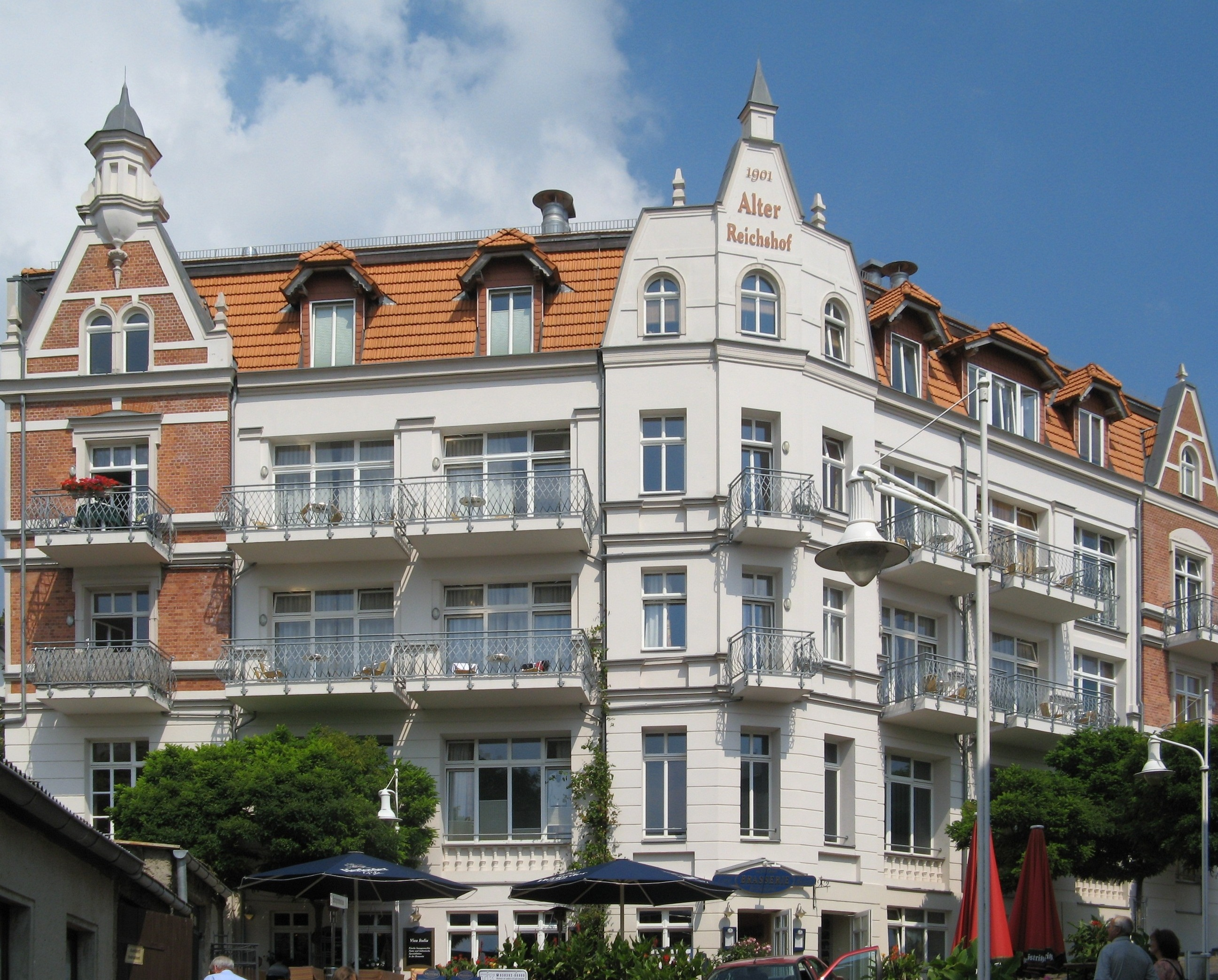
'Alter Reichshof' (imperial court)

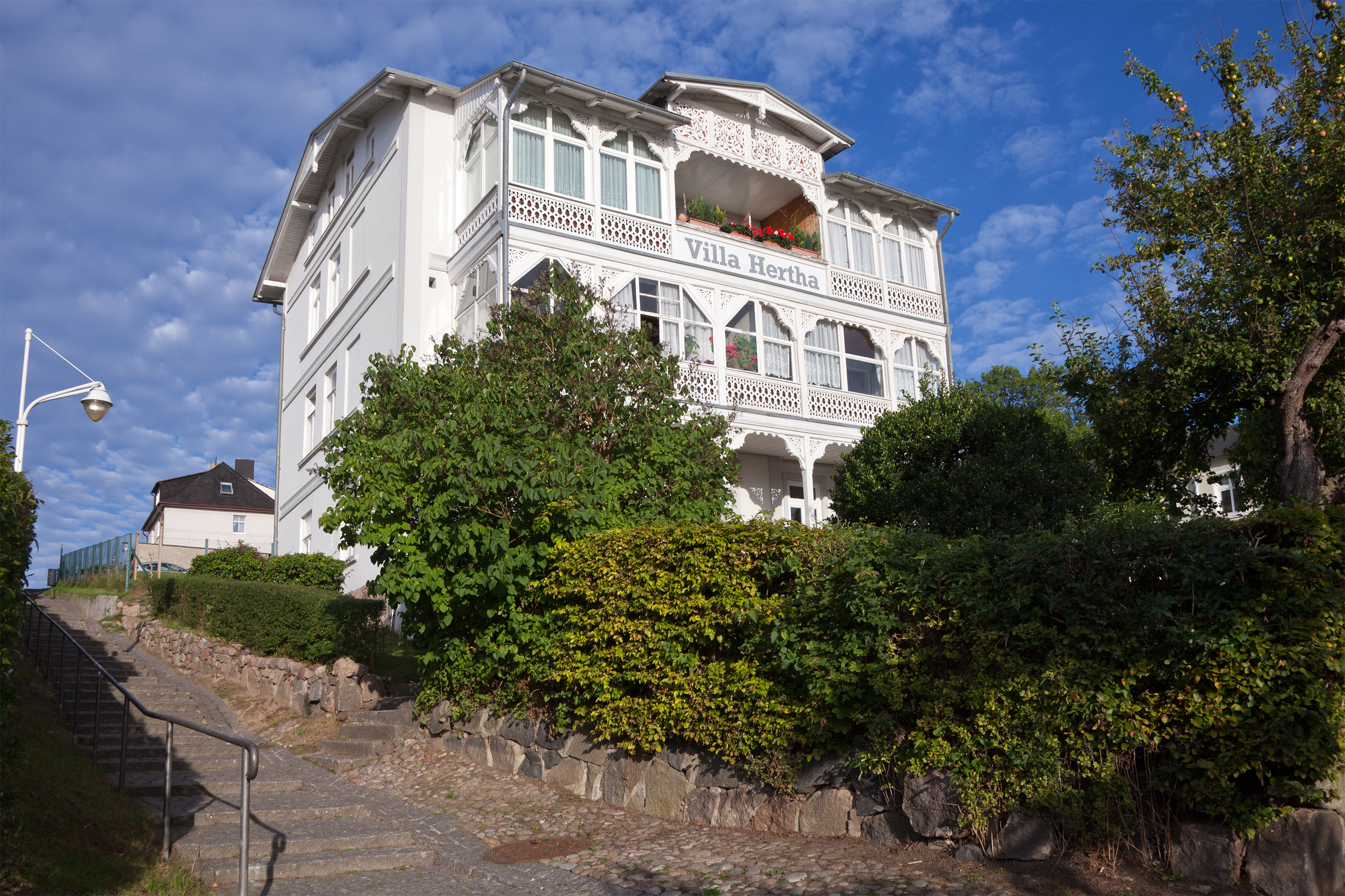
Villa Hertha, a historical mansion featuring the typical resort architecture of the region

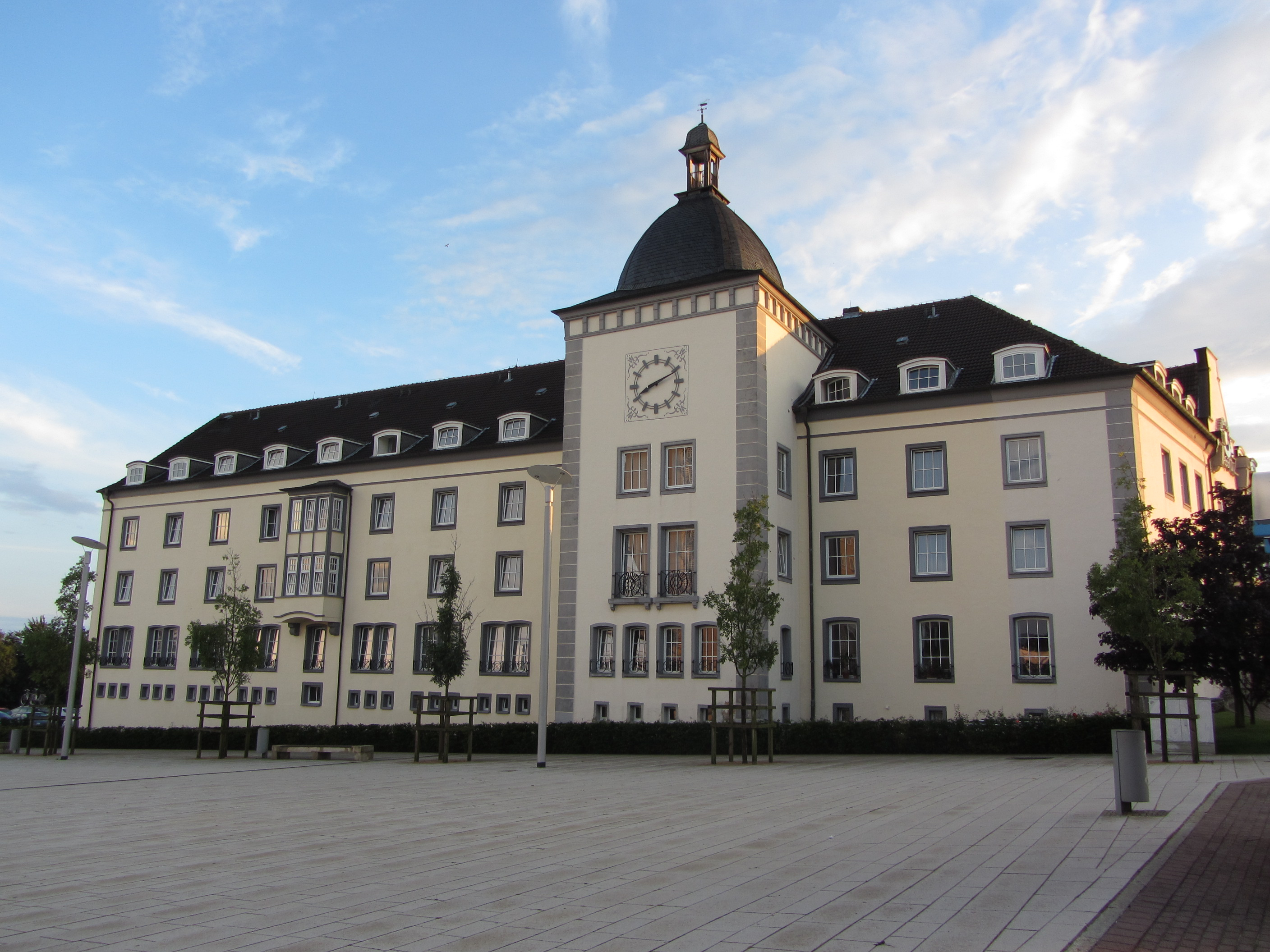
'Kurhotel', the historical health resort hotel of Sassnitz

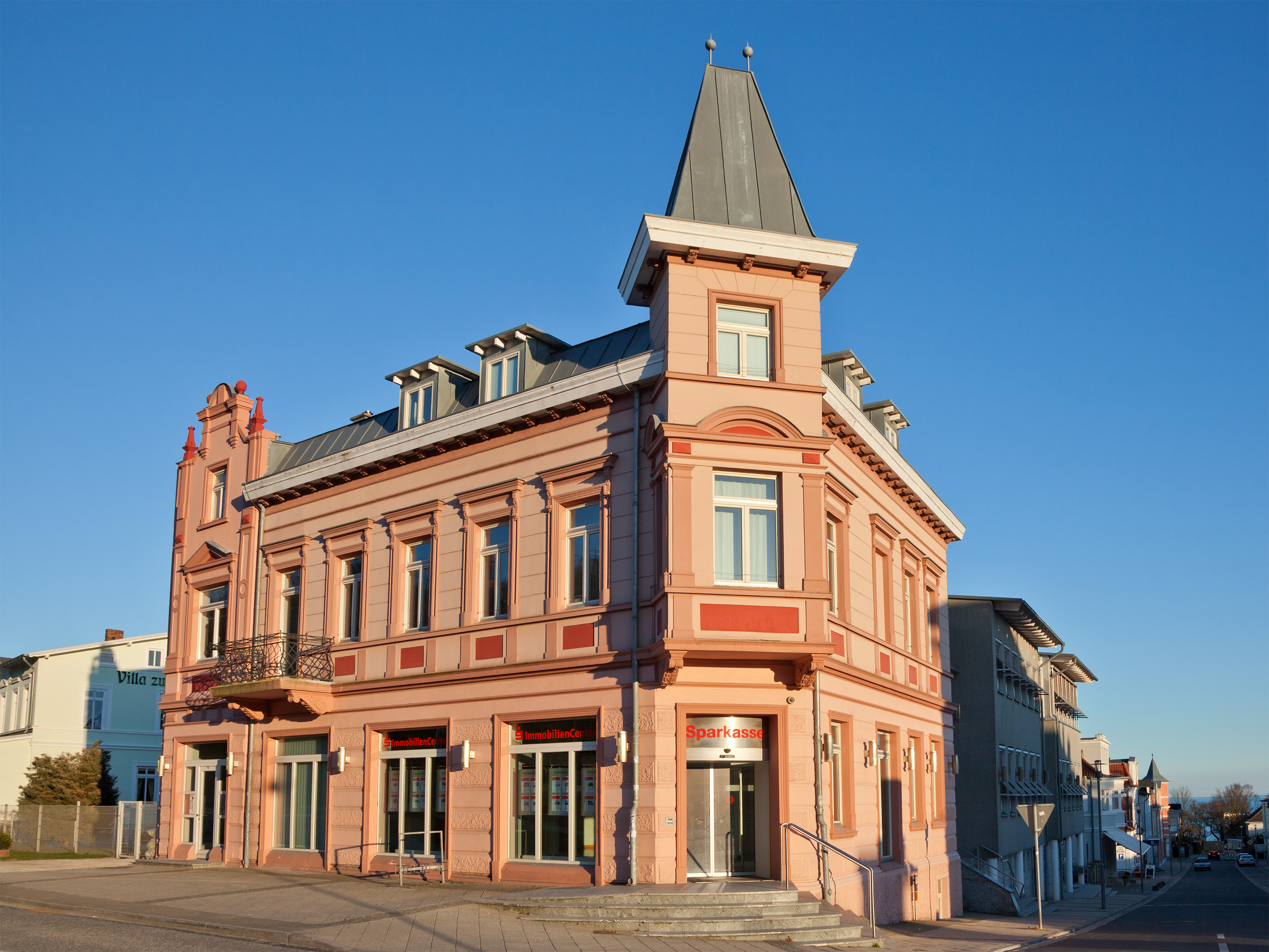
At the main shopping street of Sassnitz

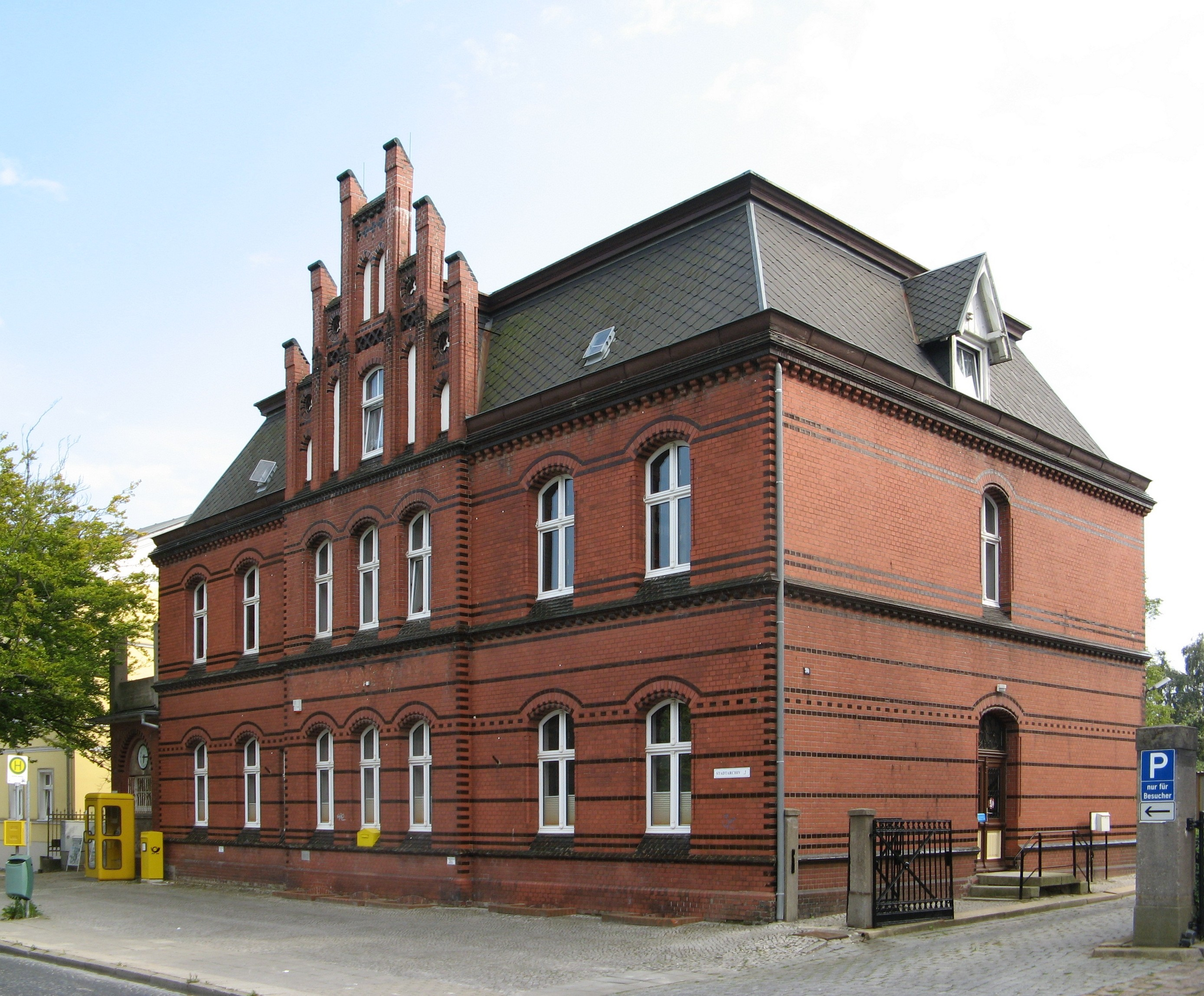
Old post office

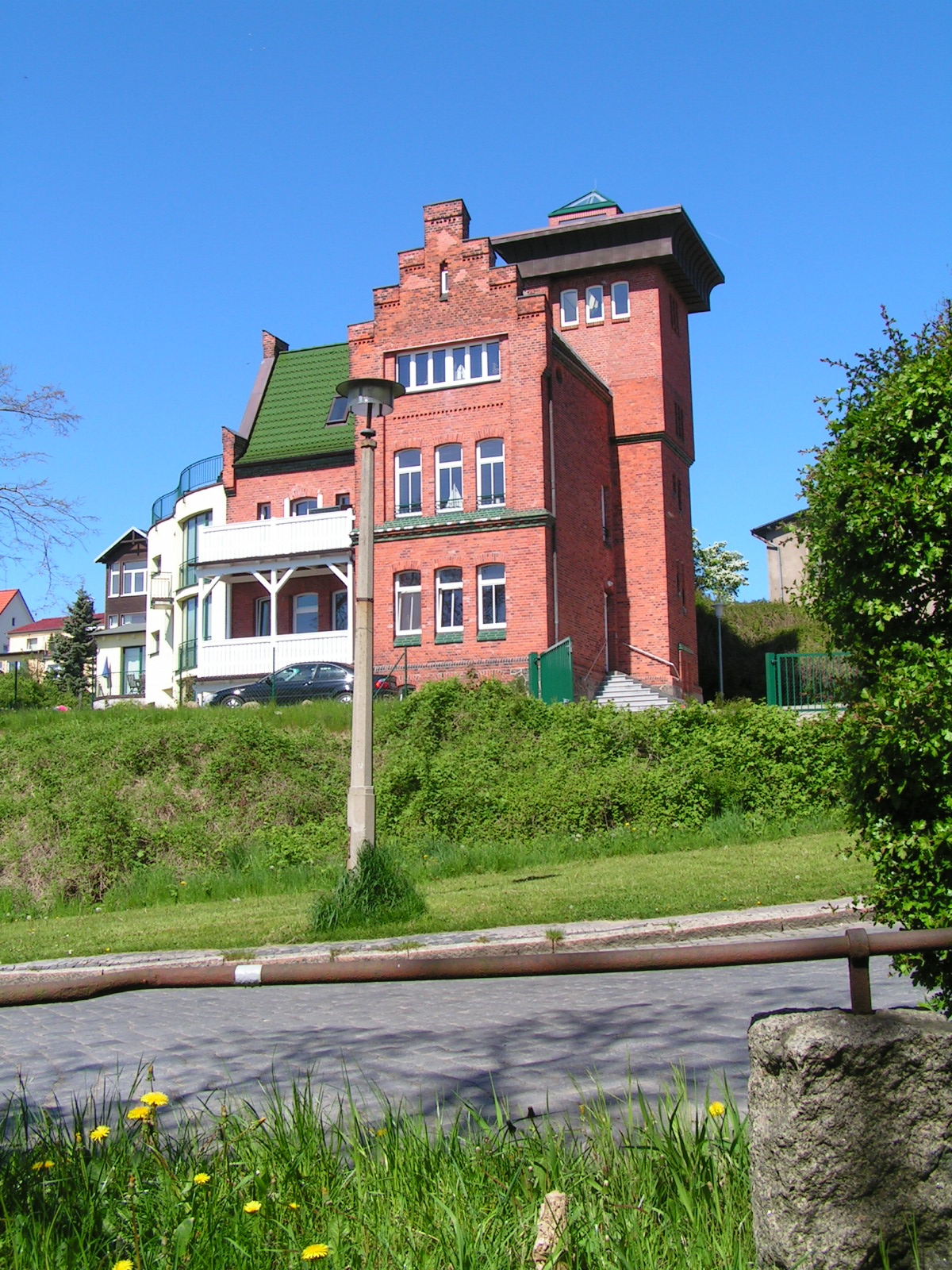
Former pilot station, now used as a vacation home

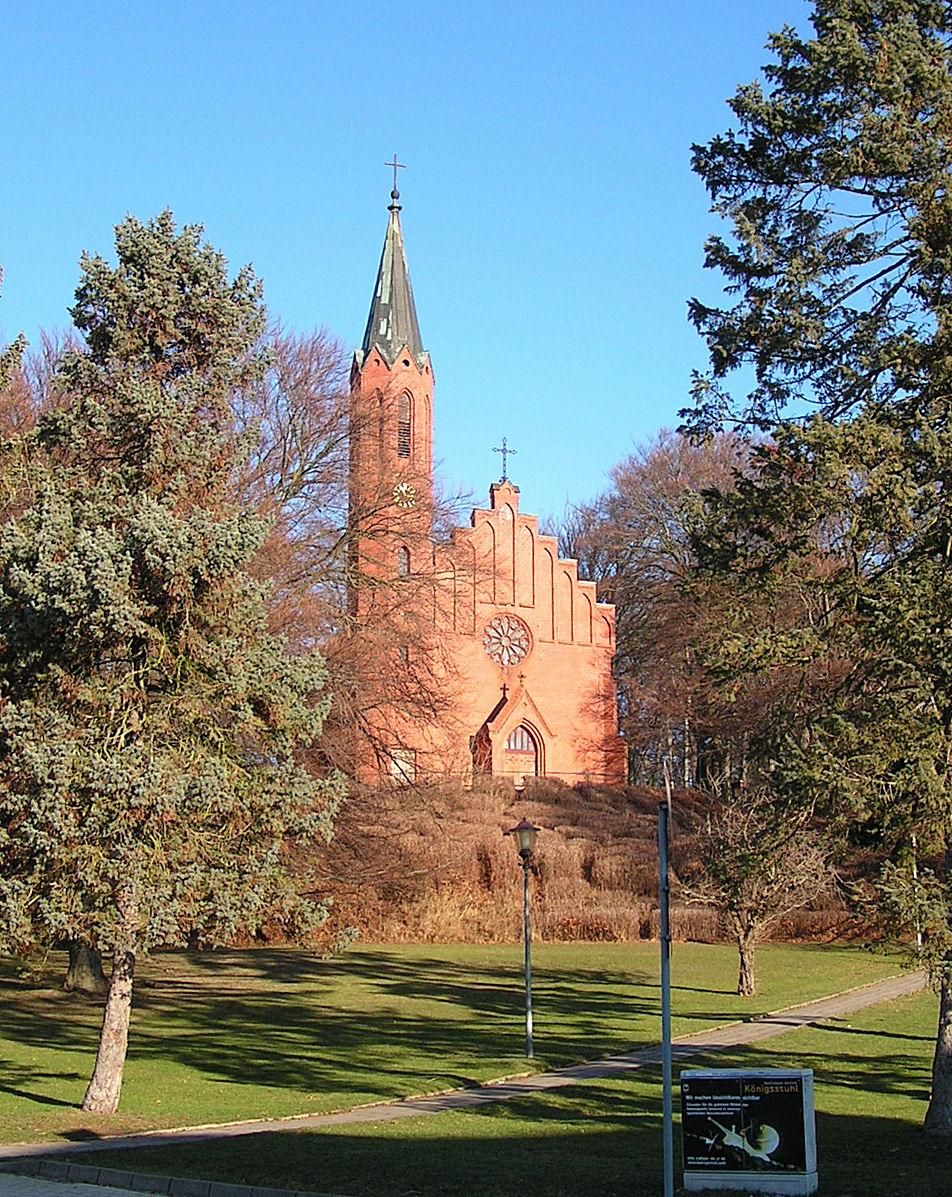
The Protestant (Evangelical) church

=== Historical monuments ===
- Memorial by sculptor, Reinhard Schmidt, erected in 1973 in the Park gegenüber dem Rathaus to the victims of fascism
- Memorial grave at the woodland cemetery (Waldfriedhof) with monument to the social democrat mariner, Hermann Bebert, who was murdered in 1945 for being a conscientious objector. Since 1970 the special needs school in Stubbenkammerstraße has been named after him
- Memorial stone in honour of Lenin, who stopped at Sassnitz on his way back to Russia from his Swiss exile in 1917. The monument is located at Rügenplatz and was restored in 2017.

=== Sport ===
- The SG Empor Sassnitz has about 700 members and is the largest sports club on the island of Rügen. It has sections for football, handball, volleyball, tennis, table tennis, badminton, light athletics, judo, bowling, veterans and athletics.

=== Regular events ===
- The Sassnitz Carnival Club (Sassnitzer Karnevalclub, SKC) holds its main carnival every year at the Dwasieden Sports Hall
- Children's Festival in the wildlife park with pony rides, music and entertainment on the Sunday nearest to Children's Day
- The Midsummer Fire (Mittsommerfeuer) is an event based on Swedish tradition with guests from the twin town of Trelleborg.
- The High Street Festival (Hauptstraßenfest) is celebrated by the town together with its traders since 2001 on the last weekend in June.
- Summer concerts in St. John's Church, Sassnitz, regularly from June to September
- The annual Rügen Harbour Days (Rügener Hafentage) take place on the second weekend in July for three days in the town harbour.
- The Sassnitz Mole Soiree (Sassnitzer Molensoiree) takes place on the Sassnitzer Mole in the evening on the first Saturday in August
- Summer Festival in the wildlife park with pony rides, music and entertainment in mid-August
- Sassnitz Sail in Sassnitz Ferry Port on the third weekend in August
- Circus at the entrance to the place alternating between Julius Renz and Barlay on the last weekend in August
- The Promenade Revue on the beach promenade and pier on the last weekend in August
- Advent Market in the old town in Sassnitz in the first advent week

== Public facilities ==
=== General ===
- Town hall, Hauptstraße 33
- Sassnitz Volunteer Fire Service founded in 1903, Bachstraße 24
- Sassnitz Police Station, Bahnhofstraße 3
- Sassnitz Criminal Investigation Branch
- River Police Station, Hafenstraße 12
- Sassnitz Maritime Search and Rescue Service Station, Hafenstraße 12

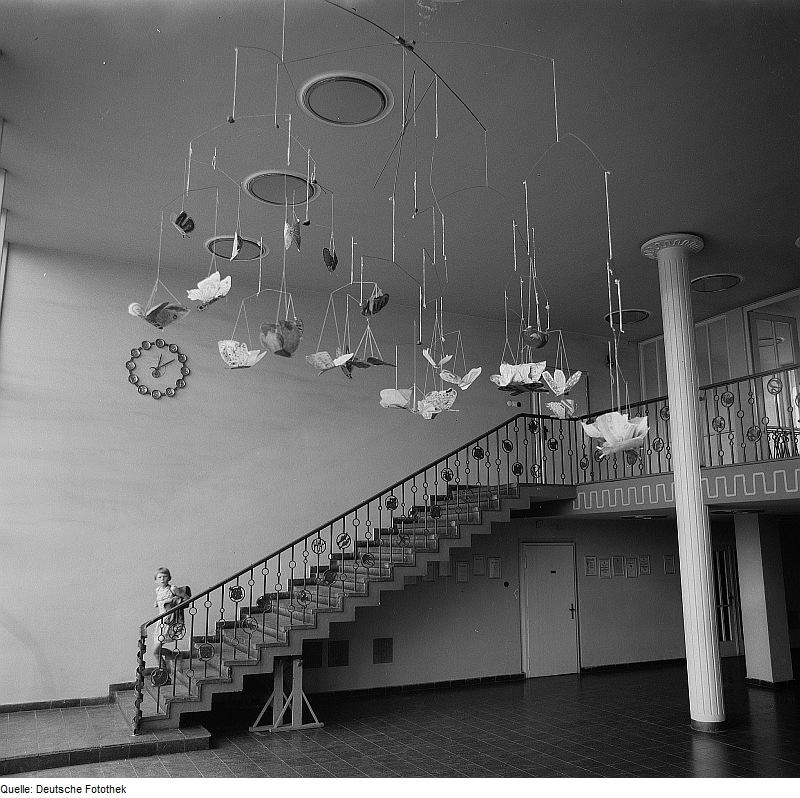
Former POS of Sassnitz (Polytechnic Secondary School), interior designed by Hermann Henselmann

=== Schools ===
- Ostseeblick primary school, Schulstraße 5
- Regional School, Geschwister-Scholl-Straße 8
- General Special Needs School, Mukraner Straße 5
- Rügen Vocational School, Straße der Jugend 7
- Ostsee-Gymnasium was a secondary school from 1953, a polytechnic secondary school from 1959/60 and from 1991 until it closed in 2008, grammar school.

=== Social, culture, sport ===
- An der Brücke nursery run by People's Solidarity (Volkssolidarität)
- Lütt Matten nursery of People's Solidarity
- Kunterbunt nursery of People's Solidarity
- 8. März nursery run by the Evangelical parish of St. John
- Dwasieden sports field on the edge of the Dwasieden Forest, 400 metre cinder track and 2 long jump pits.
- Dwasieden sports hall with handball markings and four smaller sports halls.
- A skateboard area on the path to the Dwasieden sports hall

== Economy ==
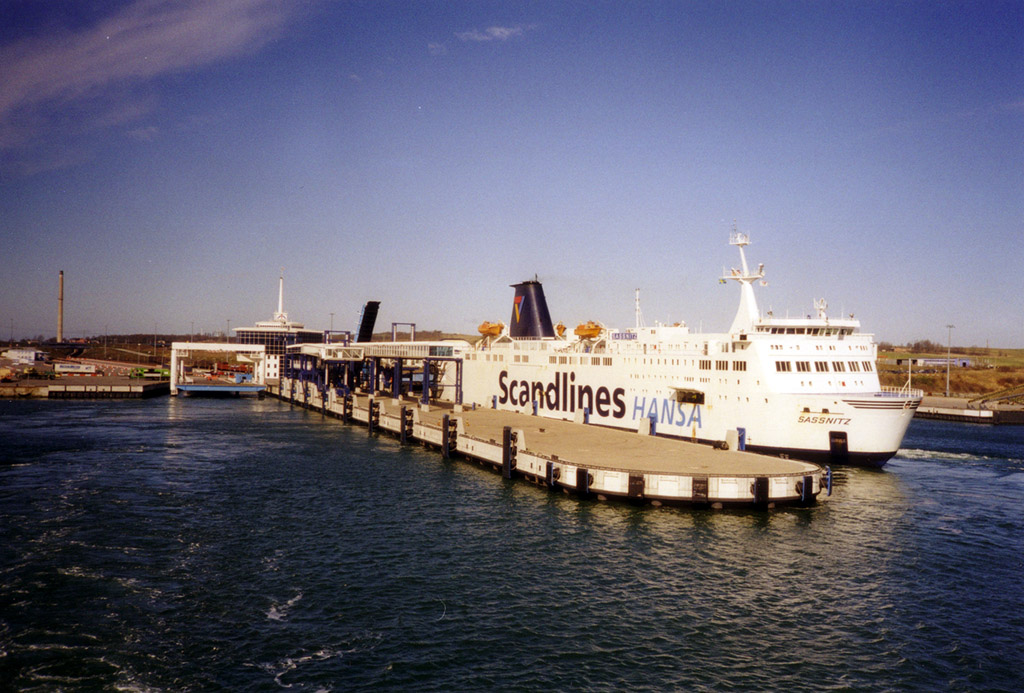
Sassnitz Ferry port

The economy of Sassnitz is dominated by tourism and the port.

Chalk quarrying near Klementelvitz, not far from Sassnitz, is a traditional industrial activity on the island. As early as 1840, chalk was quarried here in open pits. The chalk is not just used to manufacture gypsum, but is also used by power stations for their filtration plants, due to its high quality. Rügen Chalk (Rügener Kreide) is also used for curative and preventative medicines.

The firm of Neue Rügenfisch is located in the town harbour. The company, which was modernised after Germany's reunification, employs around 200 people and produces a large range of tinned fish.

Sassnitz Ferry Port in the subdistrict of Mukran is the easternmost deep water port in Germany. This location has the shortest sea links from Germany to Sweden, Denmark (Bornholm), Finland, Russian and the Baltic states. The port lies on the bay of Prorer Wiek immediately on the open sea and it is therefore easy for ships to dock here. Water depths of 10.50 metres (34.4 ft) make the port accessible to all classes of ship in the Baltic Sea region. Its flexible railway track system has enabled the ferry port of Sassnitz to develop into a special harbour for combined goods traffic. Today about 70,000 wagons are transferred onto the Scandlines Line to and from Trelleborg and around 7,400 wagons on the shipping lines to and from the Baltic states. Numerous industrial and trading firms are based in Sassnitz Ferry Port.

As Sassnitz Port serves as an important point of operations to the controversial Nord Stream 2 gas pipeline construction, Senators Ted Cruz, Tom Cotton, and Ron Johnson authored a personal threat to mayor Frank Kracht, announcing economic and legal sanctions should the port continue its function in the project.

At Fischwerk Mukran, owned by the Dutch company Parlevliet & Van der Plas, about 30,000 tons of herring per year are processed for the fish industry into herring pieces (Heringslappen), fillets and frozen goods. A large proportion is supplied by fishermen from Sassnitz and Mecklenburg-Vorpommern, who deliver their catches at agreed fixed prices from their own cutters, using rented fish tanks or by truck to the pier of the modern fish processing centre. The rest comes from Schleswig-Holstein, Denmark and Sweden.

The firm of INVO Bauplanung from Ribnitz-Damgarten wants to build a stone factory for 36 million euros on the former railway yard in the area of the ferry terminal because of its favourable location in terms of the delivery and collection of raw materials or finished goods by sea.

== Transport ==
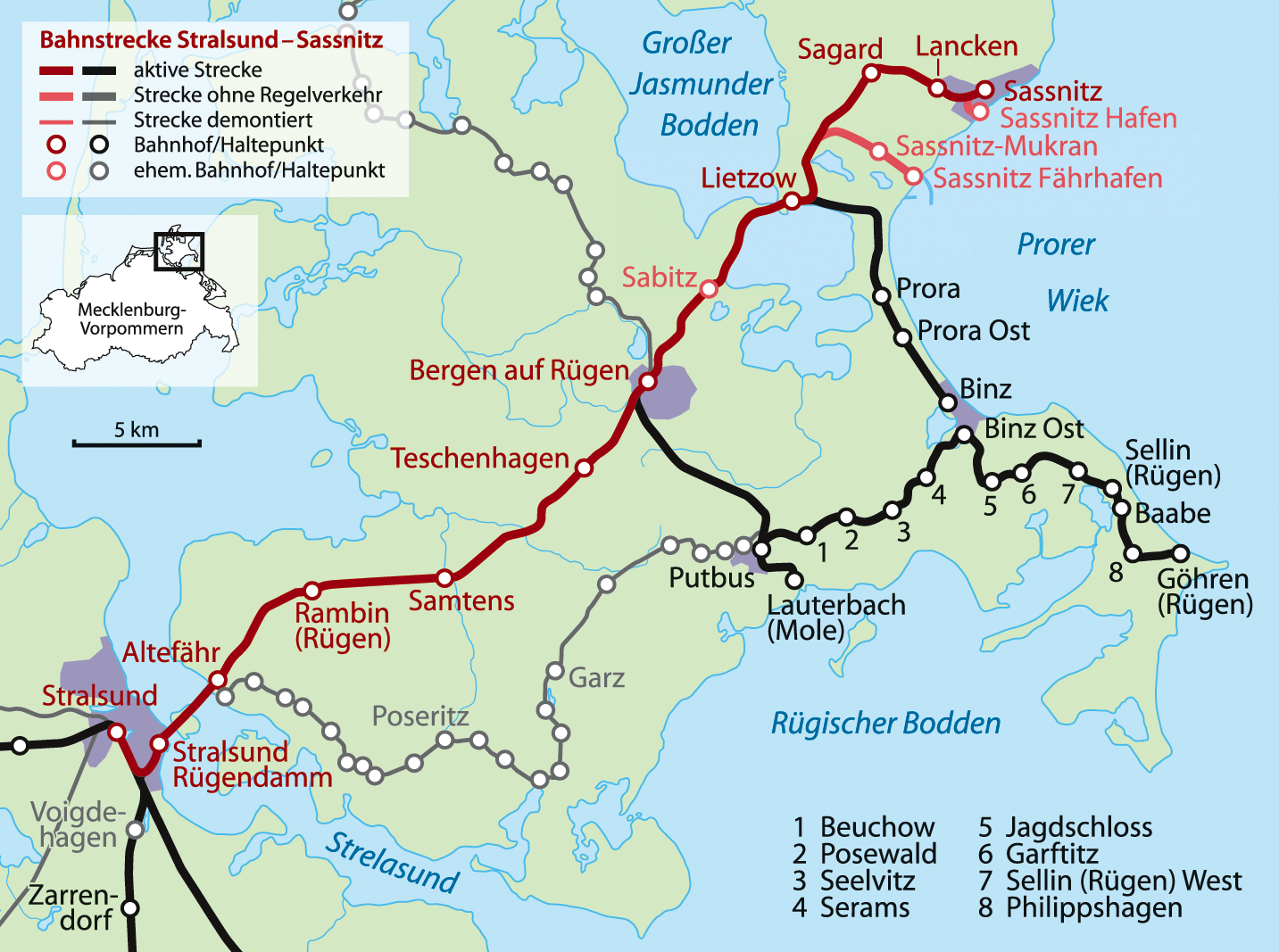
Route of the Stralsund–Sassnitz railway

Sassnitz is the end of the Bundesstraße 96 federal road and the Stralsund–Sassnitz railway.

=== Rail ===
In addition to Sassnitz station there is the ferry station of Mukran. Even before the First World War, Sassnitz Hafen railway station was established in Sassnitz as a ferry terminal for the so-called Kings Line from Germany to Sweden (Trelleborg). In the 1980s, a new ferry terminal with broad- and standard gauge tracks was built in the subdistrict of Mukran. From Mukran there are ferries to and from Klaipėda in Lithuania, to Bornholm and Saint Petersburg. On the ferry to Sweden, railway wagons are transported in addition to road vehicles. As well as the Berlin to Malmö night train, with sleeping and couchette cars, there were about 60,000 wagons in 2004.

In 1984 a new ferry service was inaugurated between Neu Mukran and Klaipėda, providing a route between the Soviet Union and the German Democratic Republic which bypassed Poland. It was equipped with rail ferries fitted with five parallel Russian 1,520mm gauge tracks. Wagons had their bogies swapped for onward travel, or were unloaded, at extensive railway yards in Neu Mukran. This link eased the supply of Russian troops in Germany in a period when Poland had become less supportive politically and wished to quadruple the transit fees it was paid. Ironically in 1994 the ferry was used to ship Russia's nuclear missiles out of Germany.

=== Ports ===
- New Mukran ferry port (Ferry lines to Trelleborg (Sweden), Klaipėda (Lithuania), Baltijsk (Russia), Rønne (Denmark) )
- Fishing port
- Marina

== Notable people ==
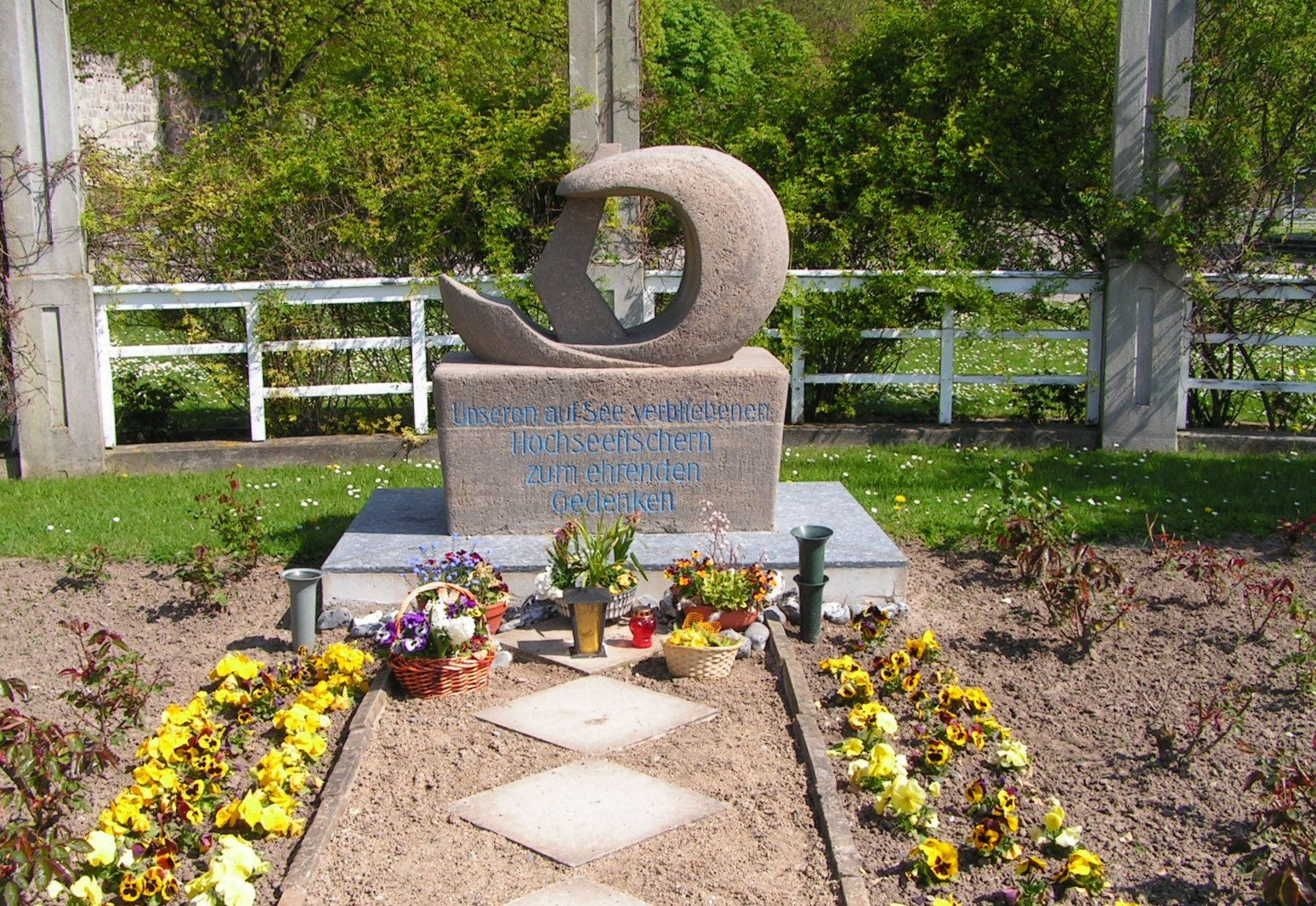
Monument to the deep sea fishermen in Sassnitz who did not return from sea

- Friedrich Schleiermacher (1768–1834) sent his wife and children in 1824 to Sassnitz for a long time. This year is seen as the birthday of Sassnitz as a seaside resort.
- Caspar David Friedrich (1774–1840), was inspired in 1818 by the chalk cliffs on the steep coastline of the Jasmund near Sassnitz and painted his famous work Chalk Cliffs on Rügen.

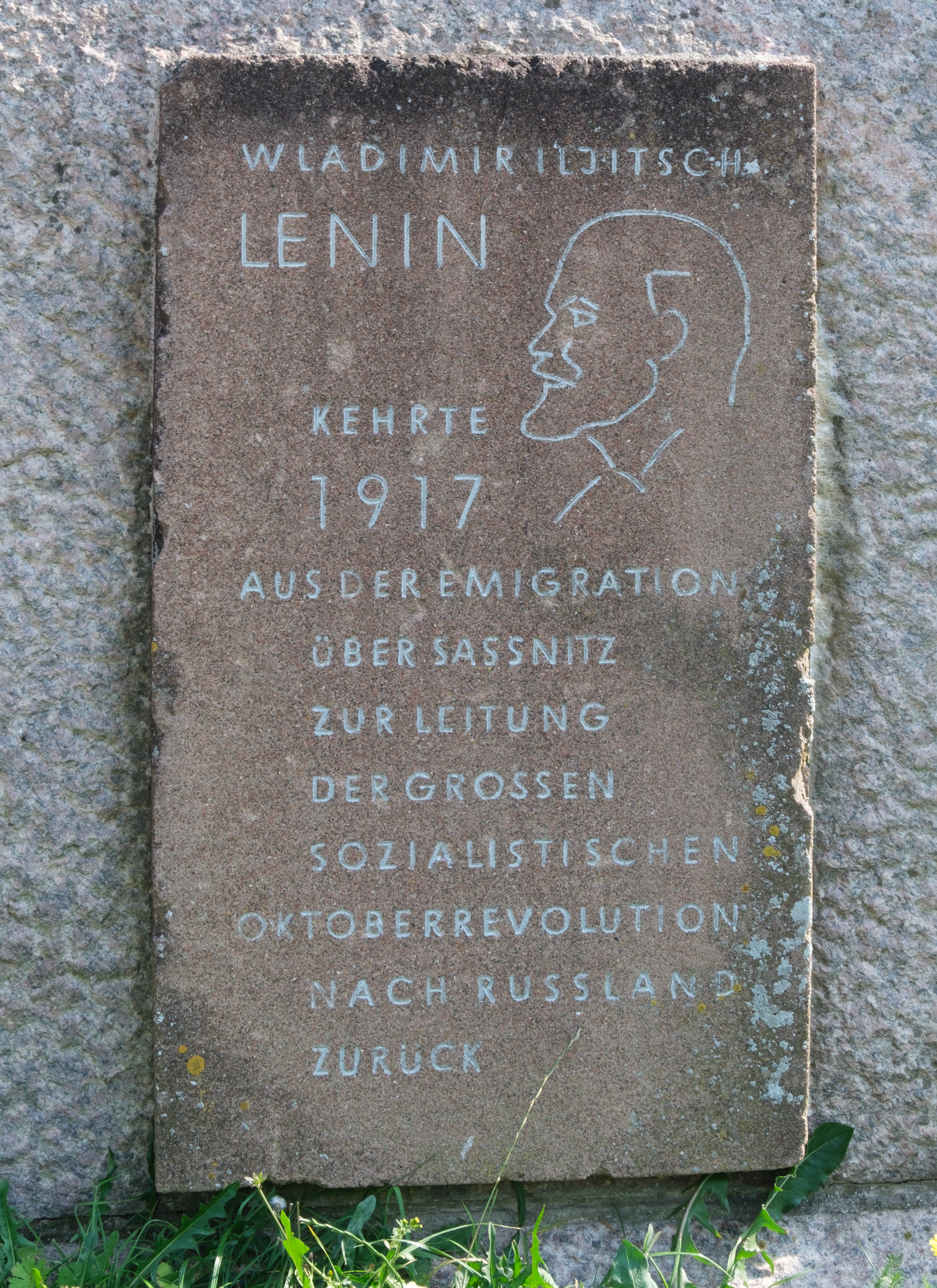
Monument to Lenin in Sassnitz

- Theodor Fontane (1819–1898) collected in Sassnitz in 1895 ideas for his novel Effi Briest
- Johannes Brahms (1833–1897) spent a long time in Sassnitz in 1876. He composed there the last movement of his 1st symphony in C minor.
- Empress Augusta Victoria (1858–1921) spent a long summer holiday in Sassnitz in 1890 together with the prince. They stayed in Villa Martha right on the cliff-top above the Kurplatz.
- Vladimir Ilyich Lenin (1870–1924) in 1917 travelled from Switzerland via the Sassnitz–Trelleborg ferry to Finland and Saint Petersburg.
- Steffi Nerius (born 1972), javelin thrower and Olympic medalist, received her basic light athletics training at the SG Empor Sassnitz.

== Legend ==
The Königsstuhl also takes its name from a story in the legendary past. Whomsoever wished to be king, had to climb up the cliffs from the seaward side.

Another legend has it that the notorious pirate Störtebeker was born on Jasmund in 1340 at Ruschvitz manor house. The Pirates' Gorge (Piratenschlucht) in Sassnitz not far from the old town is supposed to have been one of the many hiding places for Störtebeker and his Victual Brothers in the Baltic Sea area. Since 1993, the Störtebeker Festival has taken place in the summer months on the open-air stage at Ralswiek.

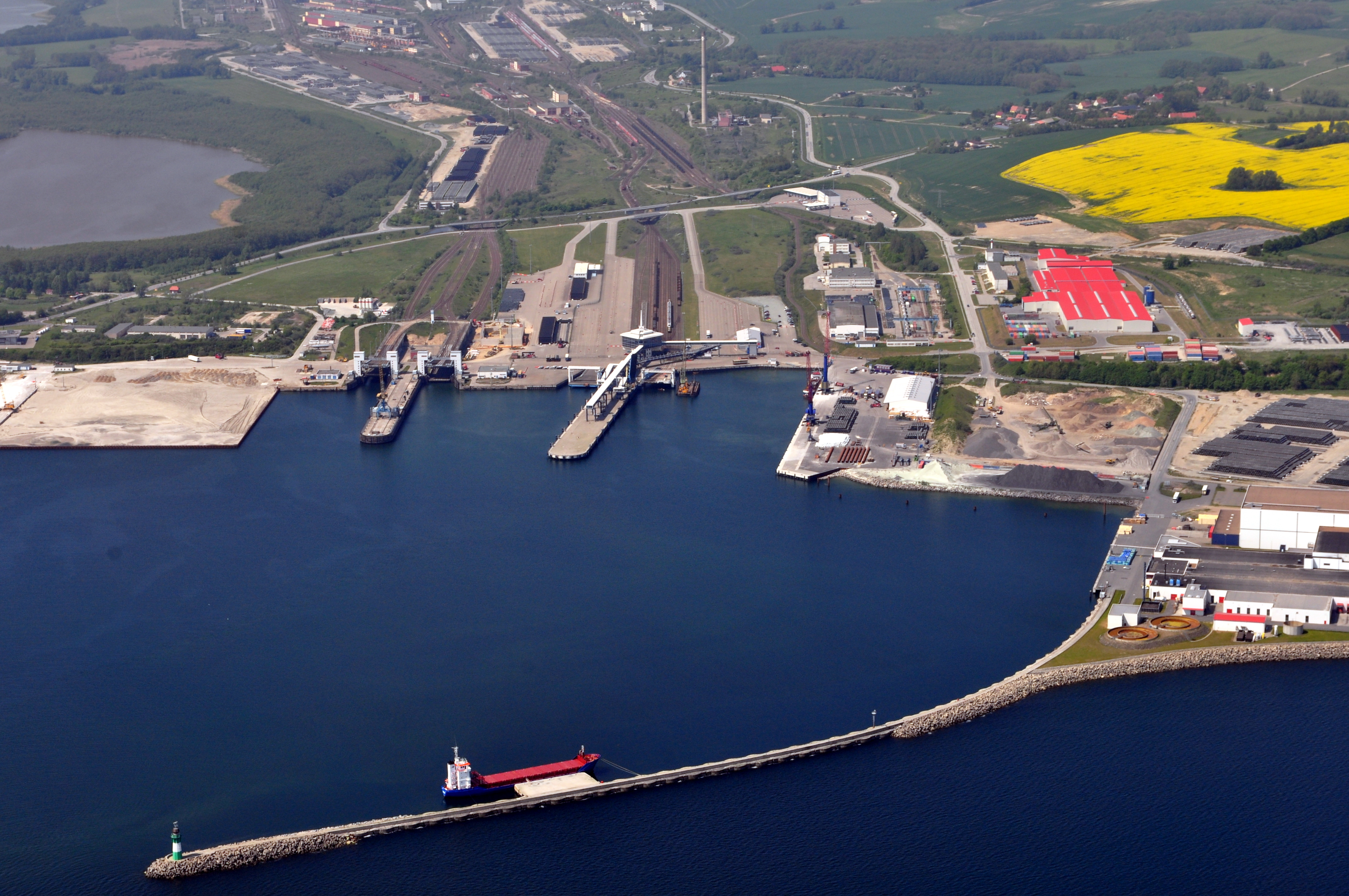
New Mukran Port
