= Sassnitz Wildlife Park =

Coordinates: 54°31′08″N 13°39′14″E

- Location: Sassnitz, Rügen
- Land area: 2.5 hectares
- No. of animals: 250
- No. of species: 60
- Website: Sassnitz Wildlife Park

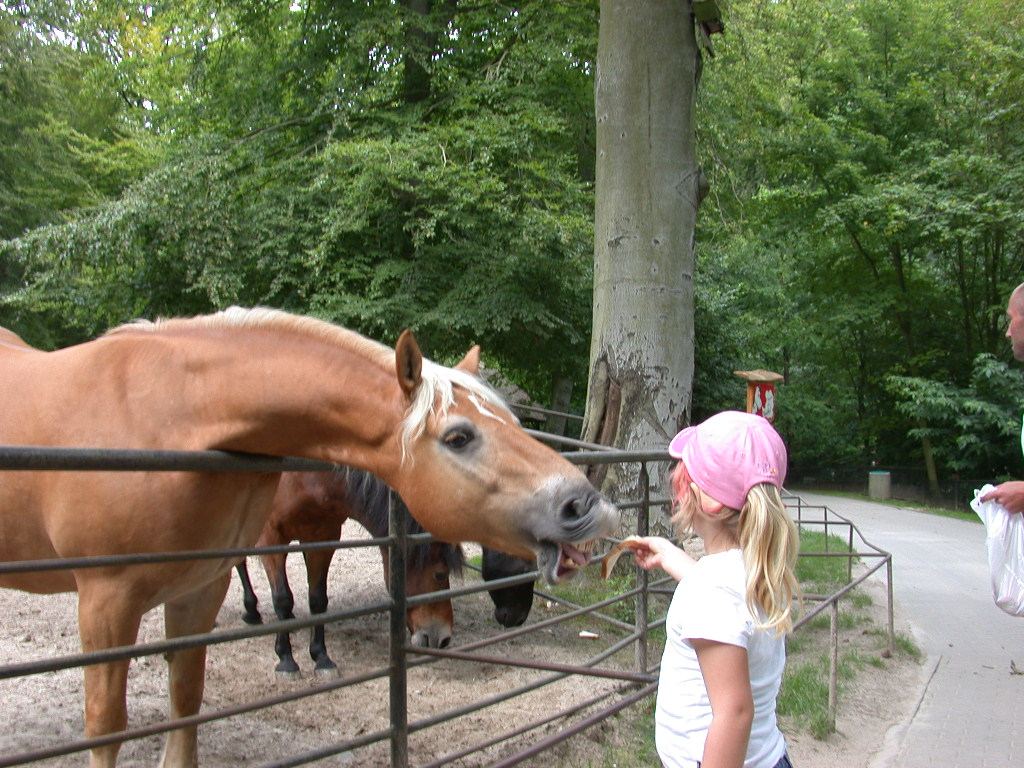
Horse enclosure

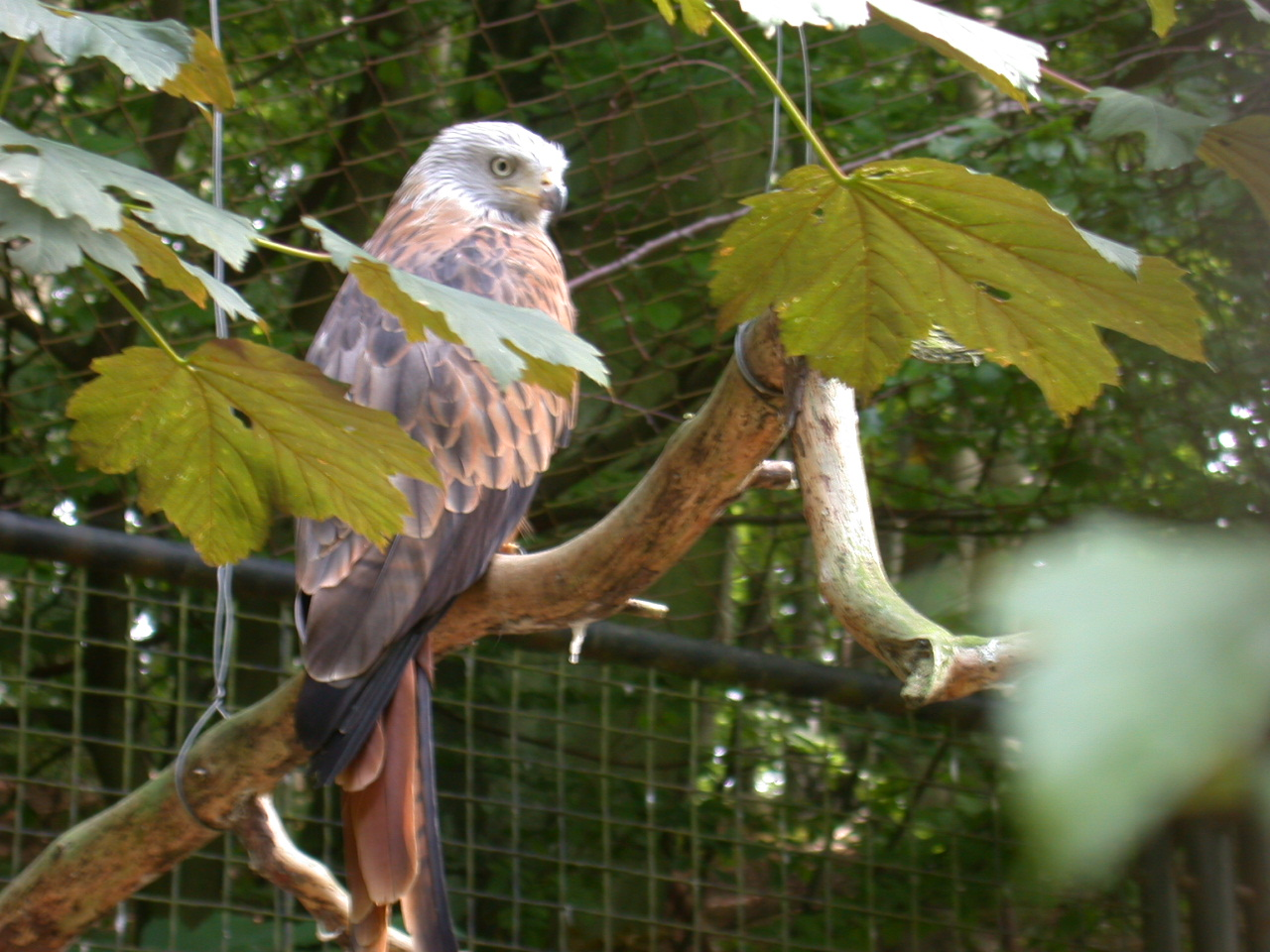
Red kite

Sassnitz Wildlife Park (German: Tierpark Sassnitz) is a wildlife park in the borough of Sassnitz on the German Baltic Sea island of Rügen.

The park is open year-round and covers an area of 2.5 hectares on the edge of the town of Sassnitz. About 250 animals of 60 species are kept in the park. These are predominantly native animals, but there are exotic species as well.

Sassnitz Wildlife Park is the only park of its kind on Germany's largest island. In 2001 it received 27,000 visitors.

In addition to a kiosk, which caters for visitors gastronomically, the park has an open-air stage, a play park, and a petting zoo. An educational trail offers information about native animals and plants.

Amongst the species kept are eagles, monkeys, fallow deer, degu, red squirrel, magpie, ducks, donkeys, owls, pheasants, trout, ferrets, fox, rabbits, lynx, weasels, guinea pigs, coatis, horses, sheep, snowy owl, eagle-owl, tawny owl, wildcat, wild boar, gray wolf, zebra finch and goats.
