= Großer Wostevitzer Teich =

Lake in Mecklenburg-Vorpommern, Germany

- Location within Mecklenburg-Vorpommern
- Location: Jasmund, Rügen, Mecklenburg-Vorpommern
- Coordinates: 54°29′41.17″N 13°32′18.30″E
- Primary outflows: Saiser Bach
- Basin countries: Germany
- Surface area: 0.743 km^{2} (0.287 sq mi)
- Average depth: 0.93 m (3 ft 1 in)
- Max. depth: 1.9 m (6 ft 3 in)
- Water volume: 710,000 m^{3} (25,000,000 cu ft)
- Surface elevation: 0.2 m (7.9 in)

Großer Wostevitzer Teich is a lake on Jasmund peninsula of the island Rügen, Mecklenburg-Vorpommern, Germany. At an elevation of 0.2 m, its surface area is 0.743 km².
