= Up There Cazaly =

1979 single by the Two-Man Band

- Cover of the 1983 reissue

Single by The Two-Man Band
- B-side: "The Winner's March (Instrumental)"
- Released: 1979
- Genre: Novelty; pop rock
- Length: 2:40
- Label: Fable
- Songwriter: Mike Brady
- Producer: Peter Sullivan

"Up There Cazaly" is a 1979 song by Mike Brady, written to promote Channel Seven's coverage of the Victorian Football League (VFL). It was first performed by the Two-Man Band, a duo of Brady and Peter Sullivan, and has since become an unofficial anthem of Australian rules football.

The title refers to early-20th-century ruckman Roy Cazaly. Known for his prodigious leap, Cazaly formed a famous ruck combination with South Melbourne teammates Fred "Skeeter" Fleiter and Mark "Napper" Tandy. It was ruck-rover Fleiter who was the first to call "Up there, Cazaly!" when the ruckman flew for the ball. The catchcry was soon adopted by South Melbourne supporters and eventually entered the Australian lexicon as a common phrase of encouragement.

Released independently on Fable Records, the song became the highest-selling Australian single ever, with sales of over 240,000 as of October 1979 and 260,000 by the end of 1980. It held this record until February 1981 when Joe Dolce's "Shaddap You Face" sold more than 290,000 units.

At the Australian 1979 TV Week/Countdown Music Awards, the song was nominated for Most Popular Australian Single.

== Background ==
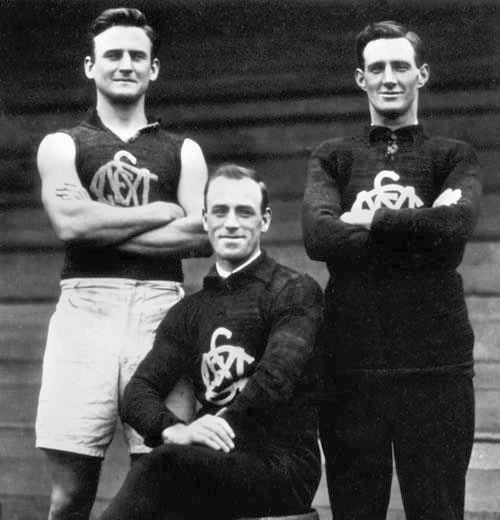
Left to right: Mark Tandy, Fred Fleiter and Roy Cazaly.

"Up there, Cazaly!" was used as a battle cry by Australian troops during World War II. It has been noted that Cazaly's distinctive surname most likely contributed to the phrase's enduring popularity. As one journalist noted, "'Up there, McKinnon' might not have taken off".

Australian dramatist Ray Lawler included the phrase in his 1955 play Summer of the Seventeenth Doll when he had heroine Nancy use it on several occasions, most notably in a telegram with marked dramatic effect: "Up there, Cazaly. Lots of Love. Nance."

== Track listing ==
1. "Up There Cazaly" (Seven's Footy Theme) (2:40)
2. "The Winner's March" (Instrumental) (2:54)

== Reception ==
In 1979, VFL star Ron Barassi described the track as "one of VFL football's real success stories" of the year, and opined that it was "destined to go down in football history." Ian Warden, a columnist for The Canberra Times, reported that he found himself singing the "banal confection" to himself all day, and that it had "somehow made it to the summit of my subconscious Top Twenty, triumphing over the greatest hits of Wagner and of Berlioz. It is all too sinister."

When asked which Australian song he would most like to cover, Spiderbait member Kram chose "Up There Cazaly", "because it's the 'Bohemian Rhapsody' of footy songs".

In an essay on her love–hate relationship with Australian football, comedian Catherine Deveny considers "Up There Cazaly" to be "schmaltzy" and "formulaic", but also gives it reluctant praise: "The cloying lyrics and emotionally manipulative music would invoke involuntary goosebumps, teary eyes and a subsequent feeling of embarrassment. The rousing chord progressions, choirs in full flight, strings in octaves and timpani created a confected majesty that tapped into our animal brains."

== Cover versions and popular culture ==
When the South Melbourne Football Club relocated to Sydney as the rebranded Sydney Swans in 1982, the club changed its song to a rewritten version of "Up There Cazaly" entitled "Up There for Sydney". The song was poorly received and the club soon reverted to its original song, "Cheer, Cheer the Red and the White".

In 1991, Collingwood great Lou Richards released a hip hop version of "Up There Cazaly" under his nickname Louie the Lip. It peaked at number 105 in Australia; a music video was also made for the song, although its whereabouts, if copies still exist, is unknown. On his 2007 album The World's Most Popular Pianist Plays Down Under Favorites, French pianist Richard Clayderman included a medley composed of "Up There Cazaly", "Tie Me Kangaroo Down Sport" and "A Pub With No Beer".

"Up There Cazaly" is featured in the 1980 film adaptation of David Williamson's play The Club.

In 1981, Ian Turner and Leonie Sandercock published a history of the VFL titled Up Where, Cazaly?: The Great Australian Game.

In an episode of the 1997 documentary series Race Around the World, "Up There Cazaly" is played over footage of John Safran streaking through Jerusalem in St Kilda colours.

You Am I vocalist Tim Rogers performed the song on a 2001 episode of The Footy Show. "Up There Calisi" is a satirical song released by TISM bassist Jock Cheese on his 2002 solo album Platter. Australian Idol finalist Shannon Noll gave his own rendition of the song at the 2011 North Melbourne Grand Final Breakfast.

In 2014, Andrew Hansen of the comedy group The Chaser wrote a new version of "Up There Cazaly" for Fox Footy.

In 2016, Australia Post launched a television advertising campaign set to a cover version of "Up There Cazaly", sung by people from different backgrounds in their own cultural style. It was affiliated with the AFL's Multicultural Round.

== Use outside Australian football ==
In 1982, "Up There Cazaly" was rewritten and released as "Up There Old England" by Cliff Portwood. Brady flew to England to help Portwood record the song but it was never released, due to the B side having a portion of "Land of Hope and Glory" on it, creating a licensing issue just as it was getting major airtime on the radio.

The song is used as the walkout tune for Tonbridge Angels Football Club in the United Kingdom. The melody is also used for a fan chant by Derby County F.C. supporters, with the title lyrics changed to "Steve Bloomer's Watchin'".

== Charts ==
=== Weekly charts ===
Weekly chart performance for "Up There Cazaly"
Chart (1979)	Peak position
Australia (Kent Music Report)	1

Weekly chart performance for "Up There Cazaly '99" by Haley White and Mike Brady
Chart (1999)	Peak position
Australia (ARIA)	78

=== Year-end charts ===
Year-end chart performance for "Up There Cazaly"
Chart (1979)	Position
Australia (Kent Music Report)	13

== See also ==
- Australian rules football in popular culture
