= List of AFL Grand Final pre-match performances =

The AFL Grand Final is held annually on or near the last Saturday afternoon in September. Each year, pre-match entertainment is provided by musicians from past and present. Currently, the naming rights to the show are held by Australian telecommunications company Telstra, making the show known as the Telstra Pre-Game Entertainment in many official circumstances.

| Year | Entertainment | Australian National Anthem "Advance Australia Fair" |
|---|---|---|
| 1977 | Barry Crocker performs "The Impossible Dream (The Quest)" | Barry Crocker |
| 1978 | Keith Michell performs "The Impossible Dream (The Quest)" | — |
| 1979 | Mike Brady and John Farnham | — |
| 1980 | Peter Allen performed "I Still Call Australia Home". | Peter Allen |
| 1981 | Jon English performs Waltzing Matilda | — |
| 1982 | Rolf Harris sang "Waltzing Matilda" | Rolf Harris |
| 1983 | Glenn Shorrock sang "Waltzing Matilda" | Glenn Shorrock |
| 1984 | Slim Dusty sang "Waltzing Matilda" | Slim Dusty |
| 1985 | Diana Trask sang "Waltzing Matilda" | Diana Trask |
| 1986 | Olivia Newton-John sang "Waltzing Matilda" | Olivia Newton-John |
| 1987 | Daryl Somers sang "Waltzing Matilda" | Daryl Somers |
| 1988 | Noel Watson sang "Waltzing Matilda" | The Australian Children's Choir, The National Boys Choir, The Band of the 3rd Military District and The 3rd Division Australian Artillery Band |
| 1989 | John Farnham sang "Waltzing Matilda" | John Farnham |
| 1990 | Normie Rowe and Lucy Gale | Normie Rowe |
| 1991 | Daryl Braithwaite. Halftime: Angry Anderson performed "Bound for Glory". | Daryl Braithwaite |
| 1992 | Joan Carden | Joan Carden |
| 1993 | Maroochy Barambah, Archie Roach and Yothu Yindi | Maroochy Barambah |
| 1994 | Debra Byrne. The Seekers performed "I Am Australian", "Georgy Girl" and "Waltzing Matilda". | The Seekers and the Australian Youth Choir |
| 1995 | A celebration of Australian films, with John Paul Young performing "Love is in the Air" | Tina Arena |
| 1996 | A collection of past singers to celebrate the centenary grand final, including Daryl Somers, Normie Rowe, Venetta Fields, Slim Dusty, Lindsay Field, Maroochy Barambah, Glenn Shorrock, Diana Trask, Barry Crocker, Lisa Edwards, Noel Watson and John Farnham. They performed "Waltzing Matilda". | Daryl Somers, Normie Rowe, Venetta Fields, Slim Dusty, Lindsay Field, Maroochy Barambah, Glenn Shorrock, Diana Trask, Barry Crocker, Lisa Edwards, Noel Watson and John Farnham |
| 1997 | Cafe of the Gate of Salvation performed "When We Were Kings" in tribute to retiring stars and the 1997 class of the Australian Football Hall of Fame. James Morrison, Tommy Emmanuel, Tommy Tycho, Nathan Cavaleri and Marina Prior performed "Waltzing Matilda", Kelley Abbey performed "True Colors", "That's the Thing About Football" and "Up There Cazaly" and Colleen Hewett performed "The Power of the Dream" before all of the performers joined to perform "If the House is Rockin'". | Marina Prior |
| 1998 | Muhammad Ali made an appearance. Mark Seymour sang "Holy Grail". Rob Guest sang "This Is The Moment". Jane Scali and Michael Cormick sang "Waltzing Matilda"; Donna Fisk and Michael Cristiano sang "Rock 'N Footy (Rock The G)". | Rob Guest |
| 1999 | Human Nature performed "Waltzing Matilda". | Human Nature |
| 2000 | The Idea of North, Trish Delaney-Brown, Megan Corson, Andrew Piper and Nick Begie, Mike Brady, Russell Morris and Rick Price. Bachelor Girl performed "Waltzing Matilda". | Bachelor Girl |
| 2001 | Men at Work performed "Who Can It Be Now?" & "Down Under", Vanessa Amorosi performed "Rise Up" & "Shine" and INXS with Jon Stevens performed "Kick" & "New Sensation". | Julie Anthony |
| 2002 | Mark Seymour performed "Holy Grail", The Whitlams performed "I Will Not Go Quietly (Duffy's Song)" & "Best Work", Killing Heidi performed "Mascara" & "Outside of Me", Kate Ceberano performed "Waltzing Matilda" and Greg Champion & Mike Brady performed "That's the Thing About Football" & "Up There Cazaly". | Kate Ceberano |
| 2003 | The finalists from the first season of Australian Idol performed "One Day in September" and "Up There Cazaly", Michael Falzon, Katie Hoolihan and the Australian Cast of We Will Rock You performed a medley of Queen songs including Another One Bites the Dust, We Will Rock You, a Mashup of The Pride of Brisbane Town & Seven Seas of Rhye, a Mashup of Good Old Collingwood Forever & One Vision, We Will Rock You (fast version) and Bohemian Rhapsody and Christine Anu performed Waltzing Matilda. | Christine Anu |
| 2004 | Guy Sebastian performed "Waltzing Matilda". David Hobson performed "The Impossible Dream (The Quest)". Kath and Kim performed "Lady Bump" and The Ten Tenors performed the club songs for the two competing teams. | Guy Sebastian |
| 2005 | Delta Goodrem sang "I Am Australian". A celebration of the then upcoming 2006 Commonwealth Games with athletes representing all 16 sports played at the games doing a lap of honor. The finalists from the third season of Australian Idol performed "Waltzing Matilda". Silvie Paladino performed a cover of Faith Hill's "There You'll Be" in tribute to retiring stars and the 2005 class of the Australian Football Hall of Fame. Michael Bublé performed "Feeling Good" and Dame Edna Everage performed "I Still Call Australia Home" and "Up There Cazaly". | Silvie Paladino |
| 2006 | Irene Cara performed "Flashdance (What A Feeling)". The finalists from the fourth season of Australian Idol performed "Waltzing Matilda". The Young Divas performed "You're the Inspiration" in tribute to retiring stars, Members of the Australian 2006 FIBA Women's World Championship team, the 2006 winners of the Brownlow Medal (Adam Goodes), Coleman Medal (Brendan Fevola) & AFL Rising Star (Danyle Pearce) and the 2006 class of the Australian Football Hall of Fame. Artists from the Countdown Spectacular tour (Brian Mannix, John Paul Young, Sean Kelly, Daryl Braithwaite, Joe Camilleri and Shane Howard) performed a medley including "Yesterday's Hero", "I Hear Motion", "The Horses", "Solid Rock", "Everybody Wants to Work", "Hold On to Me" and "Up There Cazaly". | Brian Mannix, John Paul Young, Sean Kelly, Daryl Braithwaite, Joe Camilleri and Shane Howard |
| 2007 | TV Rock performed a DJ Remix that was set to highlights of the 2007 AFL Season and Jet performed "Rollover DJ", "Rip It Up" and "Are You Gonna Be My Girl". | Natalie Bassingthwaighte |
| 2008 | Powderfinger performed "(Baby I've Got You) On My Mind" and AC/DC's "It's a Long Way to the Top" accompanied by the City of Melbourne Highland Pipe Band, Ian Moss performed electric guitar versions of "Up There Cazaly" and the competing club theme songs. | Lucy Durack and Amanda Harrison |
| 2009 | Mark Seymour performed "Holy Grail" on stage, followed by Jimmy Barnes singing "No Second Prize". John Farnham then sang "You're the Voice", joined later by Seymour and Barnes. The QANTAS Choir performed "I Still Call Australia Home". | The cast of Jersey Boys (performed a cappella) |
| 2010 | Pre-match entertainment was provided by INXS, who performed "Suicide Blonde", "New Sensation" and "Kick". Followed by the Melbourne Symphony Orchestra who performed orchestral arrangements of the Collingwood and St Kilda theme songs. Lyrics for the two songs were performed by Matt Hetherington (for Collingwood) and Paris Wells (for St Kilda). Lionel Richie was the grand final replay and post-match entertainment. | Cameron and Taylor Henderson; Julie Anthony (replay) |
| 2011 | Meat Loaf performed a twelve-and-a-half minute medley of his best-known songs. | Vanessa Amorosi |
| 2012 | Pre-match entertainment was Tim Rogers and Paul Kelly. Half-time entertainment was provided by The Temper Trap. | Marina Prior |
| 2013 | Birds of Tokyo performed "Lanterns". Mike Brady performed "Up There Cazaly". Hunters & Collectors performed "Do You See What I See" and "Holy Grail". | Tina Arena |
| 2014 | Ed Sheeran performed "Sing" and "The A Team" and was then joined by Sir Tom Jones where they sang "Kiss", "Mama Told Me Not to Come", "Delilah" and "If I Only Knew". Mike Brady performed Up There Cazaly. | Olivia Newton-John |
| 2015 | Chris Isaak performed "Great Balls of Fire", "Wicked Game" and "Baby Did a Bad Bad Thing". He was then followed by Ellie Goulding who sang "Love Me Like You Do" and "Burn". Bryan Adams sang "Run to You", "Summer of '69" and "Can't Stop This Thing We Started". Mike Brady performed "Up There Cazaly". | Kate Ceberano |
| 2016 | The pre-match entertainment started with Mike Brady performing "One Day In September", followed by Vance Joy who sang "Fire and the Flood" and "Riptide", then The Living End performed "Keep on Running", "Prisoner of Society". Sting performed "I Cant' Stop Thinking About You", "Message in a Bottle". With his appearance, Sting became the first artist to perform at both the NFL Super Bowl (in 2003) and the AFL Grand Final. | Vika and Linda |
| 2017 | The Killers performed "When You Were Young", "Somebody Told Me", "The Man", "Forgotten Years" (a Midnight Oil cover), "Read My Mind" and "Mr Brightside". Mike Brady then performed "Up There Cazaly". | Dami Im |
| 2018 | Jimmy Barnes and Black Eyed Peas | Mahalia Barnes |
| 2019 | Tones and I performed "The Kids Are Coming" and "Dance Monkey", followed by Dean Lewis, who performed "Be Alright" and "Waves". John Williamson performed Waltzing Matilda, followed by Paul Kelly who performed "Leaps and Bounds" and "Dumb Things". Mike Brady also performed "Up There Cazaly". | Conrad Sewell |
| 2020 | Electric Fields, Thelma Plum, Busby Marou and Queensland Symphony Orchestra opened the pre-match entertainment with a cover of Paul Kelly's "From Little Things Big Things Grow". Cub Sport performed a cover of Powderfinger's "These Days". The DMA's performed their Like a Version cover of Cher's "Believe" and their song "Criminals", Wolfmother's Andrew Stockdale performed Joker & the Thief, and Mike Brady performed "Up There Cazaly" from the MCG. | Tim McCallum |
| 2021 | Abbe May performed "Thunderstruck", Baker Boy performed a cover of "Can't Get You Out of My Head" and "Meditjin", John Butler performed "Ocean" before being joined by Stella Donnelly, Vicki Thorn, Donna Simpson, Gina Williams and Guy Ghouse for a cover of Icehouse's "Great Southern Land". Eskimo Joe performed "Black Fingernails, Red Wine" and then a cover of "Kick" by INXS. Colin Hay performed a version of "Down Under" via video from the USA. | Amy Manford (performed a cappella) |
| 2022 | For the first act, Mike Brady performed his iconic song "Up There Cazaly". Then, Robbie Williams performed a few of his hits, including "Let Me Entertain You", "Angels" and "Rock DJ" as well as "You're the Voice" to pay tribute to John Farnham, who was suffering from cancer. A tribute was also paid to the late Shane Warne. This was then followed up with Delta Goodrem joining Williams on stage to sing "Kids". | Katie Noonan |
| 2023 | Mike Brady performed "Up There Cazaly", and Kiss performed "I Was Made for Lovin' You", "Shout It Out Loud" and "Rock and Roll All Nite". | Kate Miller-Heidke |
| 2024 | Christine Anu & Zipporah Corser-Anu performed "My Island Home", Mike Brady performed "Up There Cazaly", and Katy Perry performed "Roar", "Dark Horse", "Gorgeous", "California Gurls", "Teenage Dream", "I Kissed a Girl" (with Tina Arena), "Chains" (with Tina Arena), "Lifetimes", and "Firework". | Cody Simpson |
| 2025 | Baker Boy performed "Thick Skin"; Mike Brady performed "Up There Cazaly"; and Snoop Dogg performed "The Next Episode", "Nuthin' but a "G" Thang", "Drop It Like It's Hot", "Down 4 My N's", "Sweat", "Signs", "Beautiful" (with Jessica Mauboy), "Still D.R.E." (with Baker Boy), "Gin and Juice", and "Who Am I? (What's My Name?)" (with Tash Sultana). | Vera Blue |
| 2026 | G Flip performed "The Worst Person Alive" and "Bed on Fire"; Mike Brady performed "Up There Cazaly"; and Kylie Minogue performed "Love at First Sight", "In Your Eyes", "Get Outta My Way", "On a Night Like This", "All the Lovers", "Spinning Around", "Confide in Me" (with William Barton), "Slow", "Padam Padam" (with G Flip), "The Loco-Motion", and "Can't Get You Out of My Head" (with Dom Dolla). | Michael Paynter |

== See also ==
- AFL Grand Final Sprint
