= HMAS Derwent (DE 49) =

River-class destroyer escort of the Royal Australian Navy

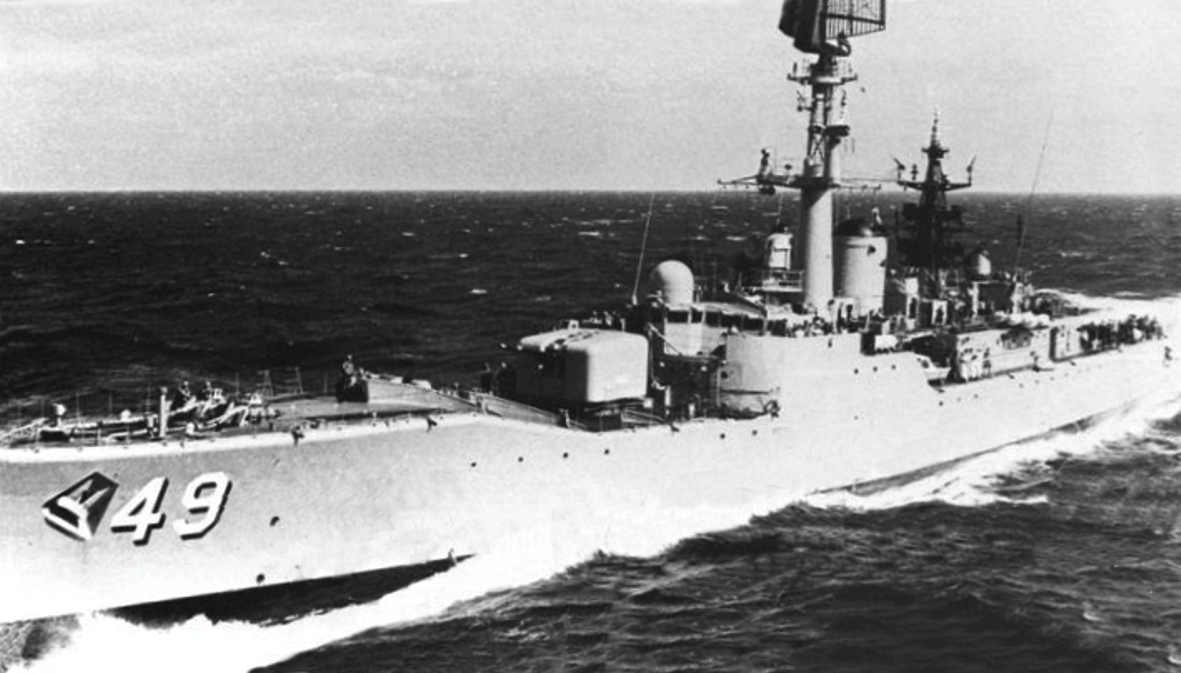
- HMAS Derwent in 1980

History

Australia
- Namesake: The River Derwent
- Builder: Williamstown Naval Dockyard
- Laid down: 16 June 1959
- Launched: 8 April 1961
- Commissioned: 30 April 1964
- Decommissioned: 8 August 1994
- Motto: "Swift and Deadly"
- Honours and awards: Battle honours: Malaysia 1964–66
- Fate: Scuttled 21 December 1994
- Badge

General characteristics
- Class & type: River-class destroyer escort
- Displacement: 2,750 tons full load
- Length: 112.8 m (370 ft)
- Beam: 12.49 m (41.0 ft)
- Draught: 5.18 m (17.0 ft)
- Propulsion: 2 × English Electric steam turbines; 2 shafts; 30,000 shp total
- Speed: 31.9 knots (59.1 km/h; 36.7 mph)
- Sensors & processing systems: LW02 long range air warning radar; Mulloka sonar system; SPS-55 surface-search/navigation radar; Mark 22 fire control radar
- Armament: 2 × 4.5-inch (113 mm) Mark 6 guns; 2 × Limbo Mark 10 anti-submarine mortars (removed 1985); 1 × quad Seacat SAM launcher; 1 × Ikara ASW system (added 1965); 2 × Mark 32 torpedo tubes (added 1985)

HMAS Derwent (F22/DE 22/DE 49), named for the River Derwent, was a River-class destroyer escort of the Royal Australian Navy (RAN). She was laid down by Williamstown Naval Dockyard in 1959, and commissioned into the RAN in 1964. During the ship's career, she was deployed to South East Asia on 23 occasions, including operations during the Indonesia-Malaysia Confrontation, and escort of the troopship HMAS Sydney to and from the Vietnam War. Multiple flag-showing cruises were also embarked upon, with port visits throughout Asia, the Indian Ocean, and the Pacific Ocean. Derwent was also briefly used to portray a fictional vessel for the British drama series Warship.

A major modernisation occurred between 1981 and 1985. In 1987, the ship's home port was changed to HMAS Stirling (Fleet Base West). In addition to usual exercises and operations, Derwent assisted with the 1987 America's Cup and the First Fleet Re-enactment Voyage. Between 1992 and 1993, the ship was used for pilotage training cruises. Derwent was paid off in 1994, and used by the Defence Science and Technology Organisation (DSTO) for ship survivability testing. Although it was originally intended to sink the ship as a dive wreck, the nature of the damage from the DSTO program made it unaffordable to render the ship diver-safe, so Derwent was towed to deep water off Rottnest Island and scuttled.

== Construction ==
Derwent was laid down by the Williamstown Naval Dockyard at Melbourne, Victoria on 16 June 1959. She was launched on 17 April 1961. The ship was officially accepted by the RAN on 23 April, and began a period of sea trials. The ship was commissioned on 30 April 1964.

== Operational history ==
=== 1964–1979 ===
On 25 May 1964, Derwent became the first RAN ship to launch a guided missile when she fired a Sea Cat missile. Most of 1964 was spent on exercises and trials, along with visits to Brisbane, Sydney, and Hobart. In December, the ship was deployed to Malaysia: Indonesia was seeking to destabilise the newly federated nation, and British Commonwealth military forces were deployed to support the Malaysian government during the three-year Indonesia–Malaysia confrontation. After spending time as guardship at Tawau, Derwent sailed to Bangkok in early 1965 to participate in multinational naval exercises under the South East Asia Treaty Organisation (SEATO). Further operations in Malaysian waters concluded in late April 1965, with the ship docking at Williamstown on 3 May for refits. The six-month refit included installation of an Ikara missile launcher.

In February 1966, Derwent and HMAS Vampire were deployed to Malaysia. Much of the deployment consisted of patrolling the Singapore and Malacca Straits for incursions by Indonesian ships into Malaysian territorial waters and intercepting civilian ships attempting to transport Indonesian soldiers to Malaysia. In March, Derwent returned to Tawau for guardship duties, and fired on Indonesian targets three times between 22 and 31 March. During April, the ship provided naval gunfire support to ground forces on four occasions. In late May and early June, Derwent was one of four RAN ships providing escort for the troopship HMAS Sydney's fourth voyage to South Vietnam. Arriving in Vũng Tàu on 6 June, Derwent remained with the former aircraft carrier during the 48-hour disembarkation of personnel and cargo. The deployment also saw Derwent visit Hong Kong, Manila, and the Salakan Islands; during the latter, personnel from Derwent began construction of a jetty as an aid project. The deployment concluded in August, with Derwent docked at Williamstown on her return for maintenance. The ship's service during the Confrontation was later recognised with the battle honour "Malaysia 1964–66"; the only one to be earned by the ship.

After training exercises during October, the ship made several port visits before returning to Sydney for Christmas. On 7 February 1967, personnel from Derwent were involved in fighting the 1967 Tasmanian bushfires. The ship was deployed to South East Asia between May and October for a series of official port visits. The ship visited ports in the Philippines, Japan, Singapore, and Hong Kong. Derwent was then docked for a major refit, lasting until May 1968. June was spent working the ship up post-refit, and in July, Derwent visited New Zealand before sailing to South East Asia. In October, the ship was deployed on another flag-showing cruise, focusing on Japan and Korea. This concluded in December, with Derwent berthed in Hong Kong for the end of the year. Further port visits took up the early portion of 1969, with visits to India and Sri Lanka. During February, Derwent again escorted Sydney on the latter's thirteenth troop transport voyage to South Vietnam. After this, Derwent called into Bangkok and Hong Kong, before returning to Sydney on 25 April. Refit work was undertaken at Williamstown. In August, Derwent visited Brisbane, then was involved in the unsuccessful search for survivors of the Australian National Line merchant vessel Noongah. The ship sailed to Hawaii in September for exercises with the United States Navy, and also visited Nouméa, New Caledonia and the Marshall Islands before docking in Singapore for two weeks of maintenance. Derwent then sailed back to Sydney via Christmas Island and the west and south coasts of Australia, and arrived on 11 December.

In April 1970, Derwent sailed for South East Asia to participate in multiple SEATO exercises. On 25 May, during Exercise Sea Rover, one of Derwent's divers died during an underwater evolution that went wrong. Multiple port visits were made during the four-month deployment, including a visit to Osaka that coincided with Expo '70. Derwent returned to Australia in July, and spent the rest of the year undergoing refit at Williamstown. After spending the early part of 1971 on training exercises in Australian waters, Derwent sailed to South East Asia in June. In late September, Derwent met Sydney en route to South Vietnam for the ship's twenty-second time, delivering a cargo of defence aid and recovering equipment and personnel from multiple units during 6 to 8 November. Derwent returned home late in the year, and visited multiple Australian ports before docking at Williamstown for refit. The refit continued until March 1972, and Derwent remained in Australian waters until August, when a four-month deployment to South East Asia commenced. In addition to port visits and SEATO exercises, Derwent and HMAS Brisbane took part in the first Australian-Indonesian naval exercise in November.

February 1973 saw Derwent, Perth, and HMAS Supply deployed to the Indian Ocean for three months to show the flag. The ships visited ports in Mauritius, Kenya, Ethiopia, Iran, Bahrain, India, Sri Lanka, and Indonesia. This was followed by visits to Singapore, Malaysia, and Indonesia again before returning to Sydney on 14 May. From July until late August, Derwent underwent maintenance, then visited New Zealand before spending the rest of the year exercising in Australian waters. Except for a visit to Norfolk Island in October, the ship spent all of 1974 undergoing maintenance and refit. This concluded in February 1975, with the ship sent to South East Asia in March. Before leaving Australian waters, Derwent visited Darwin, with personnel sent ashore to help with demolition work of structures damaged by Cyclone Tracy that previous December. After the five-month deployment, Derwent spent the rest of the year in Australian waters. Another five-month Far East deployment commenced in March 1976. In addition to the usual round of exercises and port visits, Derwent performed bottom classification sonar scans in Sunda Strait in an attempt to locate the wreck of World War II cruiser Perth, and was used to portray the fictional British warship HMS Hero for Hong Kong filming of the BBC action/drama series Warship. Derwent returned to Australia in early August, and spent the rest of the year exercising. The ship was docked for maintenance in late December, which did not complete until September 1977. After post-refit workups, Derwent and Vendetta sailed to New Zealand for exercises with Royal New Zealand Navy and United States Navy ships. From February to September 1978, Derwent operated in South East Asia. Late 1978 and most of 1979 consisted of exercises in Australian waters.

=== 1980–1994 ===
During early 1980, Derwent joined HMA Ships Melbourne, Perth, Stalwart, and HMAS Supply on a flag-showing cruise in the Indian Ocean in response to the Soviet invasion of Afghanistan: the largest RAN task group deployment since World War II. This concluded in April, and Derwent spent the rest of the year in Australian waters.

On 3 July 1981, Derwent was docked at Williamstown for a major modernisation. The ship's funnel and masts were redesigned, the LWO 2 search radar relocated from the mainmast to a new structure behind the funnel, and the MR3 fire control system was replaced with the updated M22. The ship's two Limbo mortars were removed, two three-tube torpedo launchers were fitted, and the Ikara launcher was updated. A Mulloka sonar was fitted. The ship's alternators were upgraded from 500 to 750 kilowatts (670 to 1,010 hp), and a new switchboard was fitted. As the four-and-a-half year upgrade neared completion, the ship's company joined with the Two-Man Band to record a theme song for the ship. The modernisation was completed in 1985, with Derwent reentering naval service on 6 May. Sea trials consumed the rest of the year. During 1986, Derwent participated in numerous celebrations for the RAN's 75th anniversary, was deployed to South East Asia, and participated in multiple training exercises.

At the start of 1987, Derwent's homeport was changed to HMAS Stirling in Western Australia. As part of the change of homeport, the ship's company was swapped with that of sister ship HMAS Stuart. The ship's first assignment in Western Australia was in support of the 1987 America's Cup. After exercises and a brief refit, Derwent and Swan were deployed. En route, Derwent assisted the yacht Aussiedan, which was experiencing engine troubles off Shark Bay. On Derwent's return to Australia, she participated in exercises with visiting United States Navy ships, and escorted the First Fleet Re-enactment Voyage as it entered Fremantle. On Australia Day (26 January) 1988, Derwent was involved in Bicentenary celebrations in Albany, Western Australia. This was followed by two separate deployments to South East Asia, exercises with a United States Navy task group, and a voyage in company of the Royal Navy's Global '88 deployment. Early 1989 saw a third deployment to South East Asia. The rest of the year was taken up with the ship's 25th anniversary celebrations, followed by exercises in Australian waters. On 24 January 1990, Derwent was awarded the Duke of Gloucester Cup for being the most efficient ship overall during 1989. Another Asian deployment concluded in June. After maintenance at ASI concluded in March 1991, Derwent undertook exercises until November, when she deployed to South East Asia.

In 1992, Derwent was used for pilotage training, visiting Nouméa and the Whitsunday Islands. Another round of pilotage training occurred in New Zealand in early 1993. This cruise was followed by a voyage to South East Asia. In July, the ship assisted with post-refit workups of the submarines Ovens and Orion. The ship received Freedom of Entry to Portland, Victoria in October. The rest of the year involved another pilotage training cruise, visiting New Zealand and Tonga. In March 1994, Derwent was deployed to South East Asia for the 23rd and final time, with visits to the Philippines, Singapore, the Andaman Islands, Brunei, and Malaysia. After returning to Australia, Derwent made a farewell tour of Australian capital cities, before returning to Stirling in July.

== Fate ==
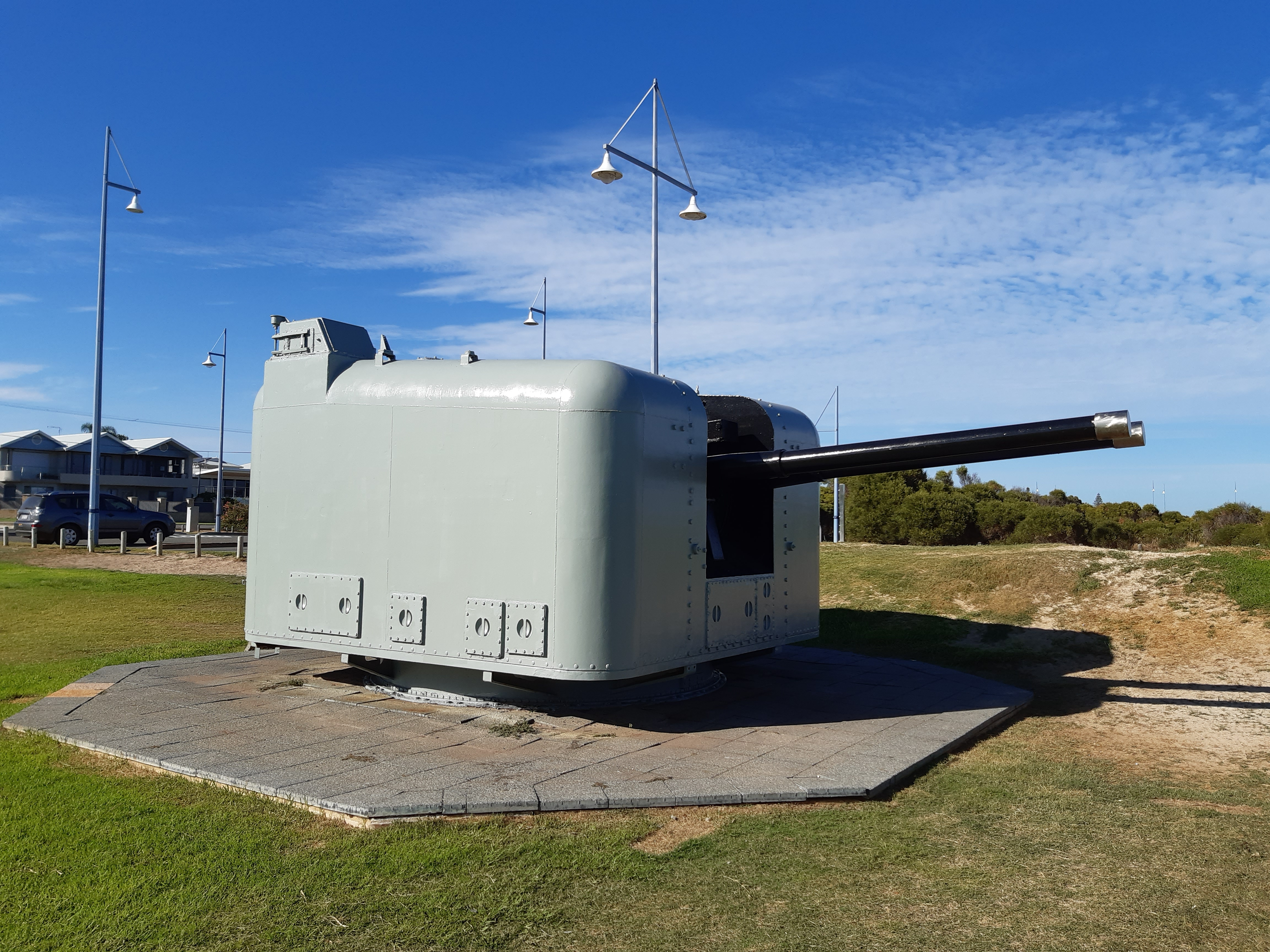
4.5-inch (110 mm) gun turret of Derwent.

Derwent was decommissioned at HMAS Stirling on 8 August 1994 after 30 years of service. Derwent had steamed 890,927 nautical miles (1,649,997 km; 1,025,260 mi) during her naval career. The Defence Science and Technology Organisation (DSTO) used the decommissioned ship for the Ship Survivability Enhancement Program, with damage inflicted on the ship to provide data on potential enhancements to make ships more resistant to damage and other threats. Plans were to then sink the ship as a dive wreck, but the nature of the damage caused during the DSTO tests made rendering the ship safe for divers unaffordable. Instead, the ship was towed to the Rottnest ship graveyard-deep water 12 nautical miles (22 km; 14 mi) west of Rottnest Island-and scuttled on 21 December 1994.

The ship's 4.5-inch (110 mm) gun turret was preserved, having been placed at the Rockingham Naval Memorial Park, opposite HMAS Stirling.
