= Postgame =

Postgame may refer to:

- Postgame (video games), extra gameplay that takes place after a video game's main storyline is completed
- Post-game show, a presentation that occurs immediately after a major sporting event
