= Pre-game show =

Presentation before the live broadcast of a sporting event

A pre-game, pregame, or pre-match show is a television or radio presentation that occurs immediately before the live broadcast of a major sporting event. They typically feature previews and analysis relating to upcoming games (either a larger fixture, or a single game), including panel discussions, reports filed from the sites of the day's game, interviews with players and other personnel (such as coaches), and other feature segments.

The networks that broadcast the NFL were the first networks to create and air pre-game shows. CBS was the first to broadcast a sports pre-game show in 1964, when the network launched a 15-minute regional sports program that interviewed players and coaches and featured news and features about the league. The show aired immediately before games on CBS. The show originated in studio and live from the fields, and featured broadcaster Jack Buck. In 1967, the show grew to 30 minutes in length and in 1976, aired a new 90-minute “Super Bowl Special” before Super Bowl X. The show moved to two hours long in 1984 and featured 11 broadcasters, 13 producers and four directors.

FOX created its own pre-game show when it won the rights to broadcast NFC games in 1994. The network hired James Brown to host the show, Fox NFL Sunday, and brought on analysts such as Terry Bradshaw to lead the coverage. In 2006, Brown left the network to return to CBS and host their pre-game show, The NFL Today.

NBC launched its own version of a pre-game show – Grandstand – in 1975, and not only featured NFL programming, but other sporting events around the nation. The show led up to the NFL's 1 p.m. games but covered college football, golf, tennis and many other sports and topics. The network hired Jack Buck to host the show and the show didn't just preview that day's NFL games but did investigative pieces on a variety of topics.

Pre-game shows generally run for 30 minutes to one hour, though on special occasions (such as championship games), it is not uncommon to air longer pre-game shows (with the Super Bowl now typically airing one across the entire afternoon prior to its evening kickoff).

While most pre-game shows are done in a studio, some shows may broadcast from the site of a particular game, either on occasion for marquee events or championship games, or on a regular basis. ESPN's College GameDay franchise (which it broadcasts for college football and basketball) and Fox's competing Big Noon Kickoff (which began as an in-studio program, but moved permanently to a travelling format akin to College GameDay in 2022) are regularly broadcast live from the campuses of schools hosting a game that the network wishes to highlight, and attended by an audience of fans that serve as a backdrop to the studio panel. Usually the chosen game is a marquee game being televised by that network, or another game of notable attention in college football (such as both College GameDay and Big Noon Kickoff broadcasting from Boulder, Colorado for the Rocky Mountain Showdown in 2023, due to attention towards Deion Sanders' debut season as head coach of the Colorado Buffaloes).

Professional wrestling pay-per-view events often feature a pre-show or kickoff show; in a similar manner to sports pre-game shows, they preview matches that will be held during the event, including recaps of the storylines which led up to them. Their main purpose is to promote the show to potential viewers that have not yet purchased the PPV, hence they are usually broadcast for free via barker channels, and/or live streamed via a promotion's social media platforms. A pre-show may also feature one or more undercard matches (such as WrestleMania's André the Giant Memorial Battle Royal). Some promotions have utilized televised programming as a pre-show; WWE previously used special episodes of its weekly program Sunday Night Heat as a pre-show for pay-per-view events, while All Elite Wrestling (AEW) introduced an occasional pre-PPV special known as the Saturday Tailgate Brawl in 2025 to encompass undercard matches, airing prior to AEW's main pre-show Zero Hour. The Saturday Tailgate Brawl is used primarily to fulfill contractual commitments to TNT for AEW's Saturday-night program Collision when it holds Saturday PPVs, as that show is cut to an hour and aired earlier in the week as a go-home show when this is the case.

== See also ==
- Halftime show
- Post-game show
- List of AFL Grand Final pre-match performances
