= HMAS Perth (D 38) =

Australian guided missile destroyer

Coordinates: 35°05′06″S 117°57′36″E

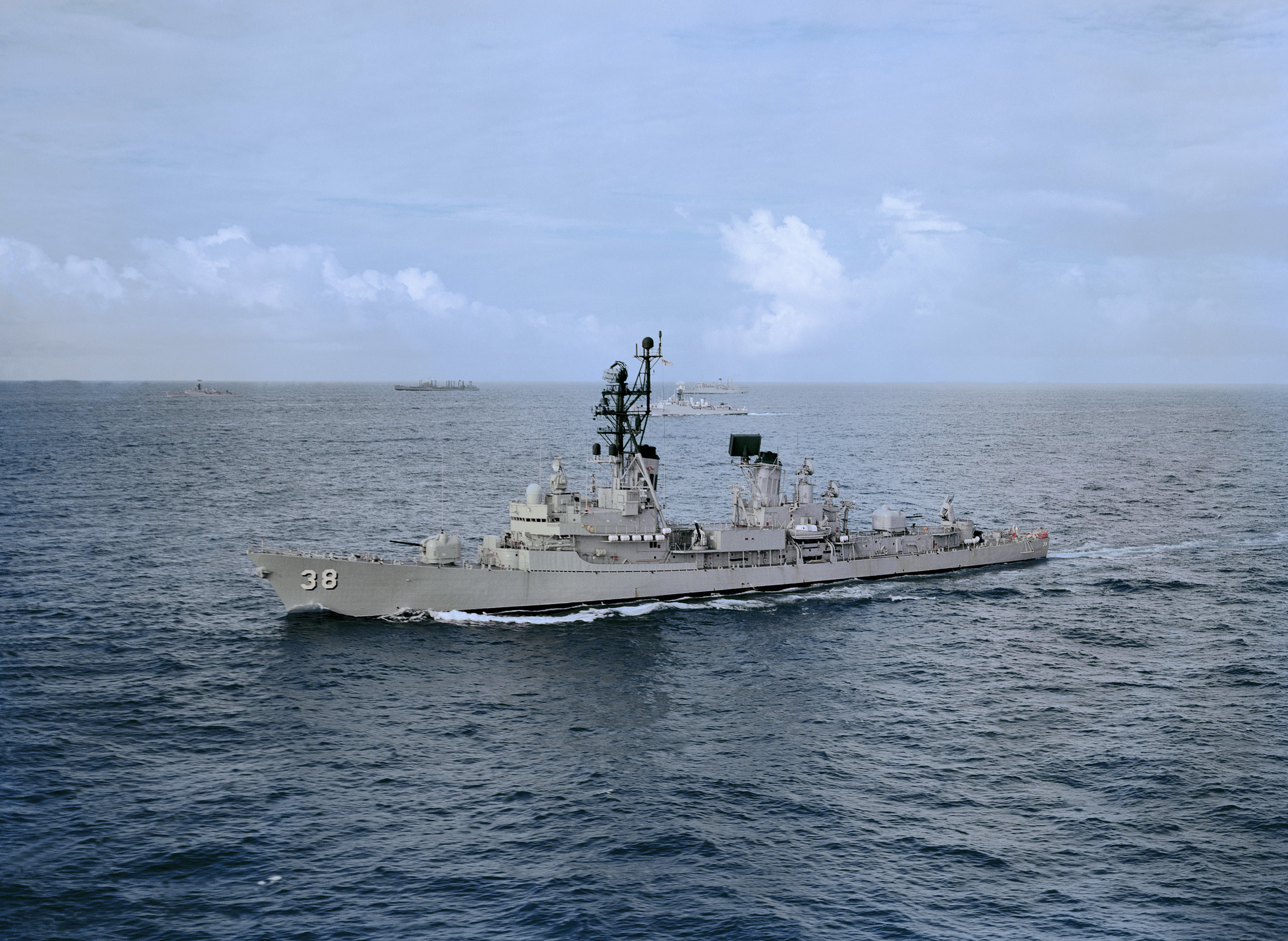
- HMAS Perth underway during the late 1980's

History

Australia
- Namesake: City of Perth
- Builder: Defoe Shipbuilding Company, Michigan, US
- Laid down: 21 September 1962
- Launched: 26 September 1963
- Completed: 22 May 1965
- Commissioned: 17 July 1965
- Decommissioned: 15 October 1999
- Motto: "Fight And Flourish"
- Honours and awards: Battle honours: Vietnam 1967–71; plus eight inherited honours; Awards: Navy Unit Commendation; Meritorious Unit Commendation
- Fate: Sunk as dive wreck 24 November 2001
- Badge

General characteristics
- Class & type: Perth-class (Modified Charles F. Adams-class) destroyer
- Displacement: 3,370 tons standard; 4,618 tons full load
- Length: 134 m (440 ft) length overall; 128 m (420 ft) between perpendiculars
- Beam: 14 m (46 ft)
- Draught: 6 m (20 ft)
- Propulsion: 4 × Foster Wheeler boilers, 2 × General Electric steam turbines, 70,000 shp (52 MW), 2 propellers
- Speed: 35 knots (65 km/h; 40 mph)
- Range: 6,000 nautical miles (11,000 km; 6,900 mi) at 15 knots (28 km/h; 17 mph)
- Complement: 311 sailors, 22 officers
- Armament: 1 × Mk 13 launcher for Tartar, then Standard missiles; 2 × 5"/54 caliber Mark 42 guns; 2 × Mark 32 triple torpedo tube sets; 2 × Ikara anti-submarine missile launchers (installed 1967, removed 1991); 2 × Phalanx CIWS (installed later)

HMAS Perth (D 38) was the lead ship of the Perth-class guided missile destroyers operated by the Royal Australian Navy (RAN). Built in the United States to a modified version of the Charles F. Adams design, Perth entered service with the RAN in 1965.

The destroyer made three deployments to the Vietnam War, earning a RAN battle honour and two United States Navy commendations for her service. The majority of the ship's career was spent on training exercises and goodwill visits to other nations, with one deployment as far as the Mediterranean. Perth was decommissioned in 1999, and sunk as a dive wreck off the coast of Western Australia in 2001.

== Design and construction ==
Perth was the lead ship of three Perth-class guided missile destroyers built for the RAN. Based on the United States Navy's Charles F. Adams class, Perth had a displacement of 3,370 tons at standard load, and 4,618 tons at full load, a length of 134 metres (440 ft) overall and 128 metres (420 ft) between perpendiculars, a beam of 14 metres (46 ft), and a maximum draught of 6 metres (20 ft). Propulsion was provided by four Foster Wheeler boilers feeding two General Electric turbines, which provided 70,000 shaft horsepower (52,000 kW) to the destroyer's two propeller shafts. Perth could achieve speeds of 35 knots (65 km/h; 40 mph). The ship's company consisted of 22 officers and 311 sailors.

As a guided missile destroyer, Perth's main armament consisted of a Mark 13 missile launcher firing Tartar missiles. This was supplemented by two 5"/54 caliber Mark 42 guns and two Mark 32 triple torpedo tube sets. Over the course of the ship's career, two Ikara anti-submarine missile launchers were installed during a refit in 1966–67, then removed in 1991, the Mark 13 launcher was modified to fire Standard missiles, and two Phalanx CIWS units were installed.

Perth was laid down at the Defoe Shipbuilding Company shipyard in Bay City, Michigan, on 21 September 1962. She was launched on 26 September 1963 by the wife of Howard Beale, the Australian Ambassador to the United States. Perth was completed on 22 May 1965, having cost $45 million to construct, and was commissioned into the RAN on 17 July. During the month leading up to the commissioning, the ship's company volunteered to help create hiking trails in the forests of Rhode Island's George Washington Management Area. The destroyer spent eight months in American waters on trials and exercises before sailing for her namesake city, via Pearl Harbor and Suva, on 12 February 1966. During construction, the ship was assigned the United States Navy hull number DDG-25.

== Operational history ==
In April 1967, Perth was ordered to Macquarie Island to rescue a seriously ill researcher. The ship arrived without incident, but conditions at the island were so adverse to boat handling that instead, the ship's diver swam ashore and back towing a liferaft.

=== Vietnam deployments ===
During the mid-1960s, the United States government pressured Australia to increase the resources it was committing to the Vietnam War; one of the requests was for a combat vessel to help the USN meet the demand for naval gunfire support operations. The idea of deploying a RAN combat ship to the Vietnam War was initially hampered by the number of ships available, particularly with commitments to the Far East Strategic Reserve and involvement in the Indonesia-Malaysia Confrontation, along with the difficulty of operating and maintaining British-designed ships with USN resources. On 14 December 1966, the Australian Cabinet approved the deployment of Hobart as part of increases to Australian military commitment to the conflict. Destroyers deployed to the Vietnam theatre generally operated in one of four roles:

- Patrols along the coast of North Vietnam as part of Operation Sea Dragon to interdict coastal shipping, with secondary attacks on inland supply lines and military targets, along with coastal defence sites that had fired on American and Australian ships. Ships assigned to Sea Dragon were normally split into a northern and southern unit (although during 1967 up to four units were operating at any time), with each unit made up of two to three ships. However, the Australian government forbade RAN vessels from operating in the northern area.
- Naval gunfire support operations to assist ground forces, particularly the United States Marine Corps units operating closest to the North Vietnam border. Seven ships were usually stationed on the 'gunline', and attacks fell into two categories: 'unspotted' shelling of areas where North Vietnamese or Viet Cong forces and facilities were known or believed to be, and 'spotted' fire missions in direct support of ground troops. In this role, Perth operated under the callsign "Gunpowder".
- Anti-infiltration operations under Operation Market Time, which aimed to stop the logistic supply and reinforcement of Viet Cong units operating in South Vietnam by tracking, intercepting, and searching coastal shipping. RAN destroyers were never formally assigned to Market Time, but the overlap of the gunline and Market Time operational areas meant the ships were often called on to assist by tracking suspicious ships or participating in raids.
- Escort of USN aircraft carriers involved in Operation Rolling Thunder airstrikes.

Although RAN ships on deployment were expected to fulfil all duties of an equivalent American destroyer, they were forbidden by the Australian government from operating outside the Vietnam theatre on unrelated Seventh Fleet duties (such as the Taiwan Patrol Force, guard ship duties at Hong Kong, or the Space Recovery Program). After the invasion of Cambodia in 1970, RAN ships were also prohibited from entering Cambodian waters.

While deployed to Vietnam, the destroyers were placed under the administrative control of Commander Australian Forces Vietnam in addition to that of the Flag Officer Commanding Australian Fleet. Operationally, the RAN vessels were under the command of the United States Seventh Fleet. Arrangements were made to provide logistic support through the United States Pacific Fleet. A USN lieutenant was assigned to each ship during deployments to act as a liaison with the Seventh Fleet. The deployment of HMAS Hobart in March 1967 began a pattern of six-month deployments for RAN destroyers, with a constant RAN presence with the Seventh Fleet. Australia was the only allied nation to provide naval support to the United States Navy during the Vietnam War.

==== First deployment ====
On 14 September 1967, Vietnam duties were handed to Perth by Hobart. The destroyer's first assignment was the gunline off the II Corps operating area, where Perth rendezvoused with USS Radford on 26 September. The ship was specifically tasked with providing gunfire support for the 1st Cavalry Division of the United States Army, which was involved in Operation Pershing. Three days later, Perth was reassigned to the northern part of South Vietnam, in response to increased North Vietnamese activity. On 2 October, both turrets broke down; both were repaired by 23:00, but the aft turret failed again the next evening, with the new problem beyond repair until replacement parts were air-dropped on 5 October. Perth was redeployed to Sea Dragon operations on 16 October, joining American cruiser USS Newport News. On the morning of 18 October, the destroyer was fired on by coastal artillery while investigating a group of fishing junks; Perth was hit once, with the shell deflecting off the aft gun turret and penetrating the superstructure to start a fire in the confidential books vault. The gun turret captain was later awarded a Distinguished Service Medal for his actions in response to the attack, while the officer of the watch was mentioned in despatches for courage and calmness under fire. Six days later, Perth and USS Rupertus fired on six small supply craft, sinking five.

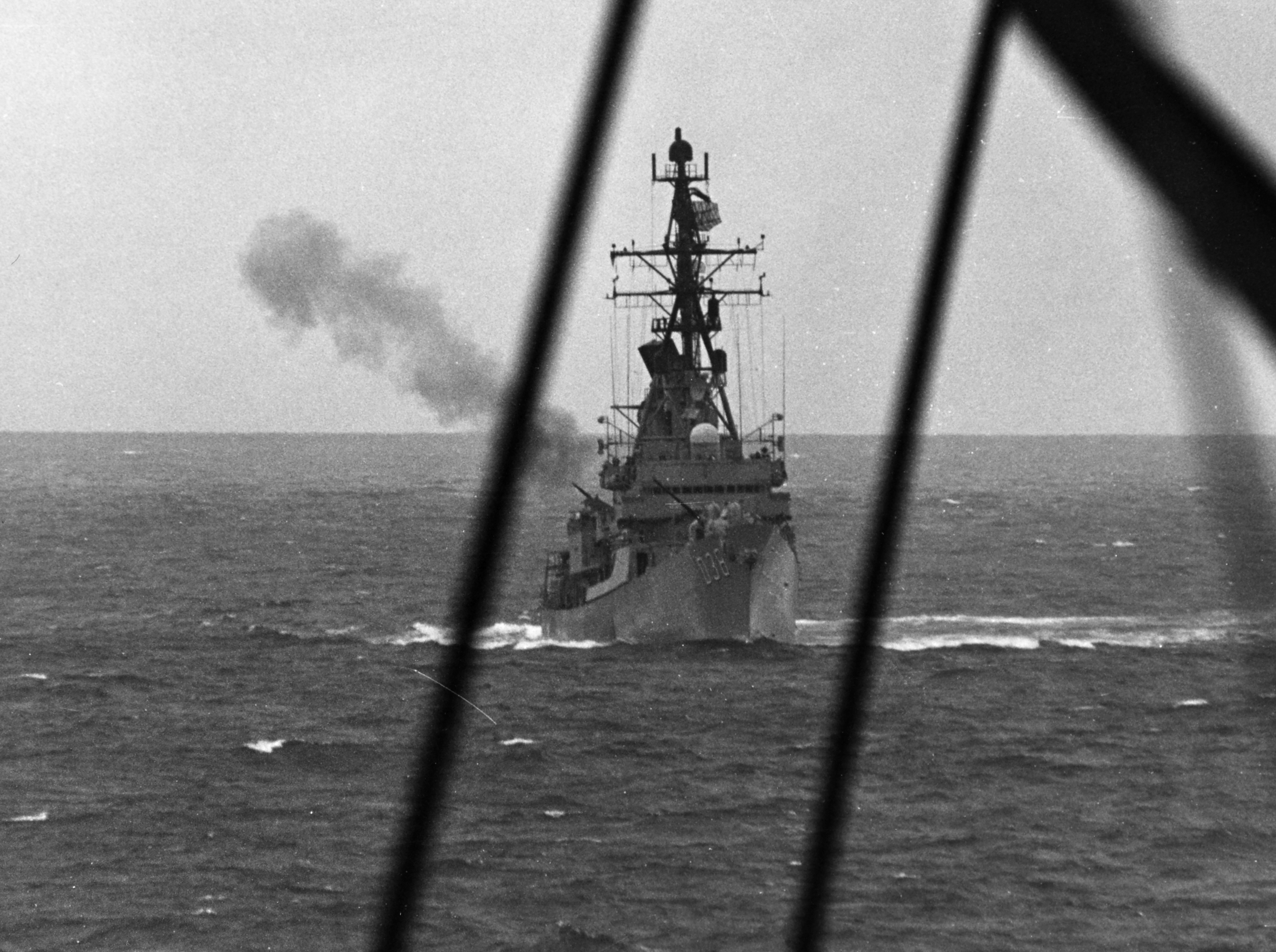
Perth firing on North Vietnamese targets, 23 February 1968

Perth sailed to Subic for emergency maintenance and rebarrelling on 26 October, and returned to Sea Dragon duties on 1 November. Another maintenance period occurred between 7 and 16 November, after which Perth sailed to Singapore for shore leave, returning to operations on 27 November. This gunline deployment lasted until 20 December, with Perth coming under shore battery fire on two occasions, but receiving no hits or damage. After maintenance at Subic, the destroyer returned Sea Dragon operations on 9 January. Problems with the forward gun turret and the starboard propeller saw Perth withdraw to Subic for repairs on 2 February. These were completed by 14 February, with the destroyer returning to the Sea Dragon force that day. The commanding officer of Perth was appointed overall commander of both the northern and southern task units; the northern unit was normally led by the commander of the assigned cruiser, but Newport News was in dock for maintenance. In mid-February, the forward gun mount malfunctioned again, which left the turret operational but unable to rotate. On 1 March, the destroyer withdrew for maintenance, returning to operations ten days later. On 23 March, Perth withdrew to Subic to conclude her tour of duty, and was replaced on 31 March by Hobart.

The destroyer was awarded the United States Navy Unit Commendation for her service during the deployment. In addition to the two personnel awards for actions in response to the 18 October hit, Perth's commanding officer was Mentioned in Despatches, and 22 personnel received Naval Board commendations.

==== Second deployment ====
On 19 September 1968, Perth departed from Sydney to replace Hobart in the Vietnam warzone. En route, a training exercise with RAAF aircraft revealed that one of the radars and both identification-friend-or-foe units had defects, which were repaired in Subic. Perth relieved her sister ship on 29 September, and after exercising with the Seventh Fleet, deployed to the gunline on 5 October. Four days later, the destroyer sailed north to relieve USS Berkeley as leader of the northern Sea Dragon unit, as that destroyer was experiencing faults with her gun turrets and targeting computer. The next day, Perth and USS Furse were joined by the battleship USS New Jersey, with the battleship taking command of the unit and the Australian destroyer was reassigned back to the southern force. On 21 October, a day after rejoining the northern Sea Dragon unit, the destroyer observed the return of 14 North Vietnamese prisoners-of-war.

Two days later, a failure of the counter-recoil mechanism in the forward turret forced Perth to withdraw from Sea Dragon and sail south to less-demanding gunline duties of Danang. She remained on station until November, when she sailed to Hong Kong for personnel leave. Operation Sea Dragon was cancelled completely on 1 November. The ship was assigned to the II Corps area on 12 November, providing gunfire support for a battalion of the Korean 26th Regiment, then later relocated south to the IV Corps area to provide similar services for the South Vietnamese 7th and 9th Divisions. Perth returned to the gunline off Danang on 12 December, sailed back to the IV Corps area four days later, then effectively turned around on arrival as the ship was ordered to sail to the II Corps area and provide gunfire support for Operation McLain; firing 511 rounds in one day. On 19 December, Perth sailed back to IV Corps, where, apart from a brief deployment to Taiwan at the start of 1969, she remained until 20 January. The destroyer was assigned to the destroyer screen of the aircraft carrier USS Kitty Hawk for ten days, sailed to Subic for maintenance on 7 February, then returned to naval gunfire support duties on 22 February. From 25 to 28 February, the ship operated in support of Operation Victory Dragon VIII, and fired 690 shells at a variety of targets. Perth continued on fire support operations until 16 March, when she sailed to Hong Kong.

Perth was awarded the United States Navy Meritorious Unit Commendation for the second deployment. An appointment as a Commander of the Order of the British Empire, two Mentions in Despatches, and 25 Naval Board commendations recognised the achievements of individual personnel during the tour of duty.

==== Third deployment ====
Perth's third and final tour of duty in Vietnamese waters began on the ship's arrival in Subic on 26 September 1970. After relieving Hobart and completing work-up trials, the destroyer arrived off Danang on 3 October and took up gunline duties in Military Region 1. On 23 October, the ship supported a United States Navy SEALs; although two commando teams were able to infiltrate the Cua Viet River, the operation was inconclusive. On 26 October, Perth sailed to Subic for maintenance and rebarrelling, and returned to gunline operations on 4 November. On 14 November, both gun turrets became unusable, although the aft turret was restored later that day. Two days later, the ship sailed south to Military Region 3. On 2 December, the destroyer moved further south to Military Region 4. Perth sailed to Hong Kong for shore leave on 22 December.

The Australian warship returned to duties on 10 January with a five-day stint at Yankee Station, escorting the carrier USS Hancock during Rolling Thunder operations. Perth was then assigned to the gunline at Military Region 4. The forward gun turret became unusable again during the latter part of January, and the destroyer sailed to Bangkok for leave on 2 February, then Subic for maintenance and repairs. The ship returned to service on 22 February, operating across Military Regions 2 and 3. There was minimal activity when operating off Military Region 3, as the presence of a gunfire support vessel was unexpected, thus no pre-planned fire missions had been made. Perth left the gunline for the final time on 7 March, and was attached to the escort group of USS Ranger. Five days later, she sailed to Hong Kong, then Subic, to conclude her Vietnam deployment. The destroyer was relieved by HMAS Brisbane on 29 March. Personnel awards for the deployment included one appointment as a Member of the Order of the British Empire, two instances of Mentioned in Despatches, and 26 Naval Board commendations.

During 1971, the Australian government decided to withdraw all forces from Vietnam by the end of the year; Brisbane was the last ship to make a combat deployment to Vietnam, and was not replaced when this deployment ended in September. Perth was awarded the battle honour "Vietnam 1967–71" for her three deployments.

=== 1970s ===
In February 1973, Perth, Derwent, and HMAS Supply sailed on a goodwill cruise to ports in Africa. On 31 July 1974, the destroyer sailed to Long Beach, California, for a modernisation and refit. Returning to Sydney on 25 September 1975, Perth spent most of the next two years on training exercises. At the end of March 1980, the destroyer undertook a two-month Pacific deployment to train with the United States Navy and other navies. From late September to early October, Perth was involved in Tuvalu's independence celebrations, before sailing to Hawaii for naval exercises.

=== 1980s ===
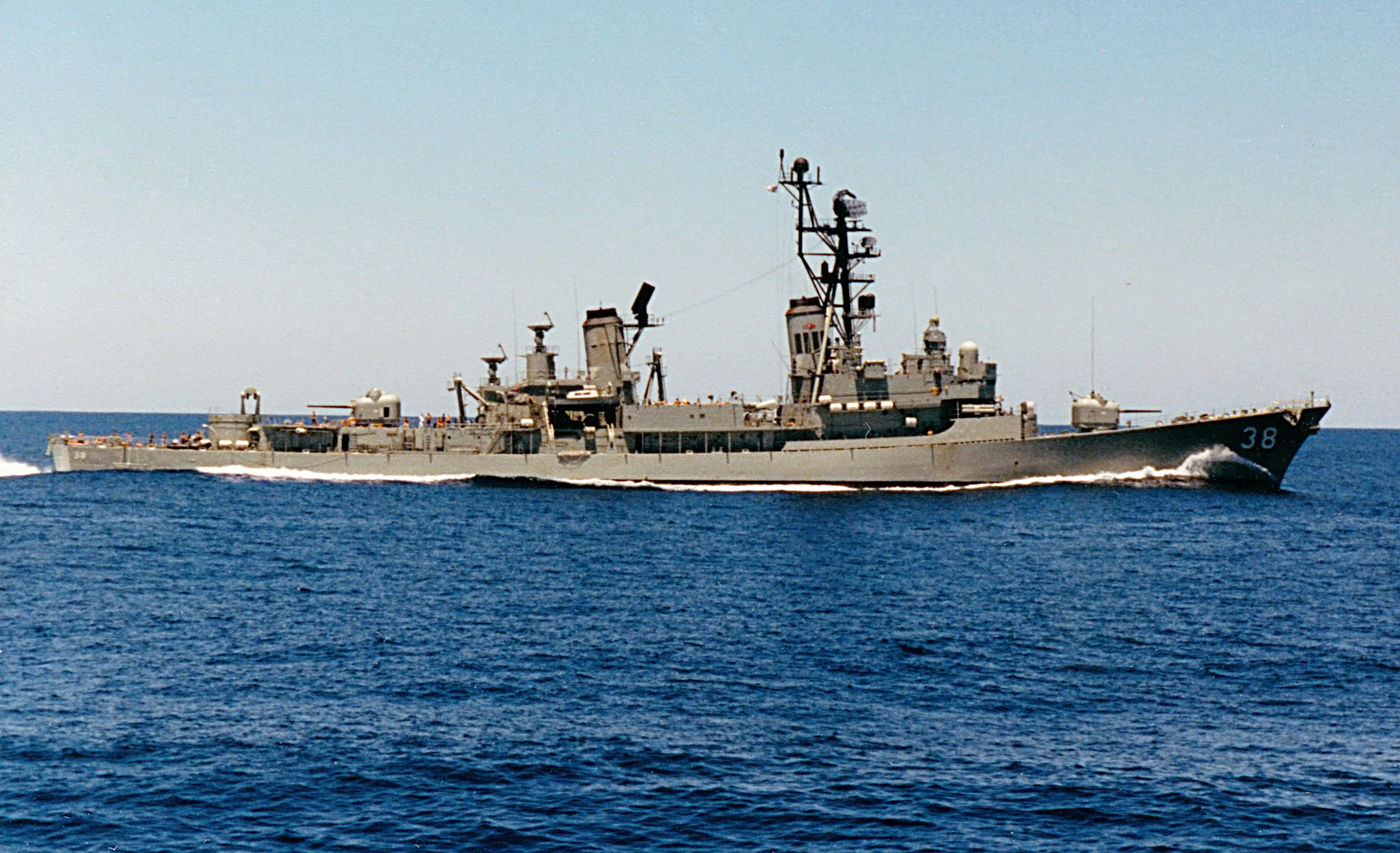
Perth at sea in 1980

During early 1980, the destroyer's propulsion system was modified to operate on diesel fuel instead of furnace oil. The upgrade was finished in May, and during July, Perth was involved in a disaster relief exercise at Jervis Bay. On 8 September 1980, Perth joined five other RAN vessels to form the Australia Squadron. The Squadron, a carrier group formed around the RAN flagship Melbourne, also included Derwent, Stalwart, Supply, and Otama, and spent two months in the Indian Ocean as part of a flag-showing cruise; the largest RAN deployment since World War II.

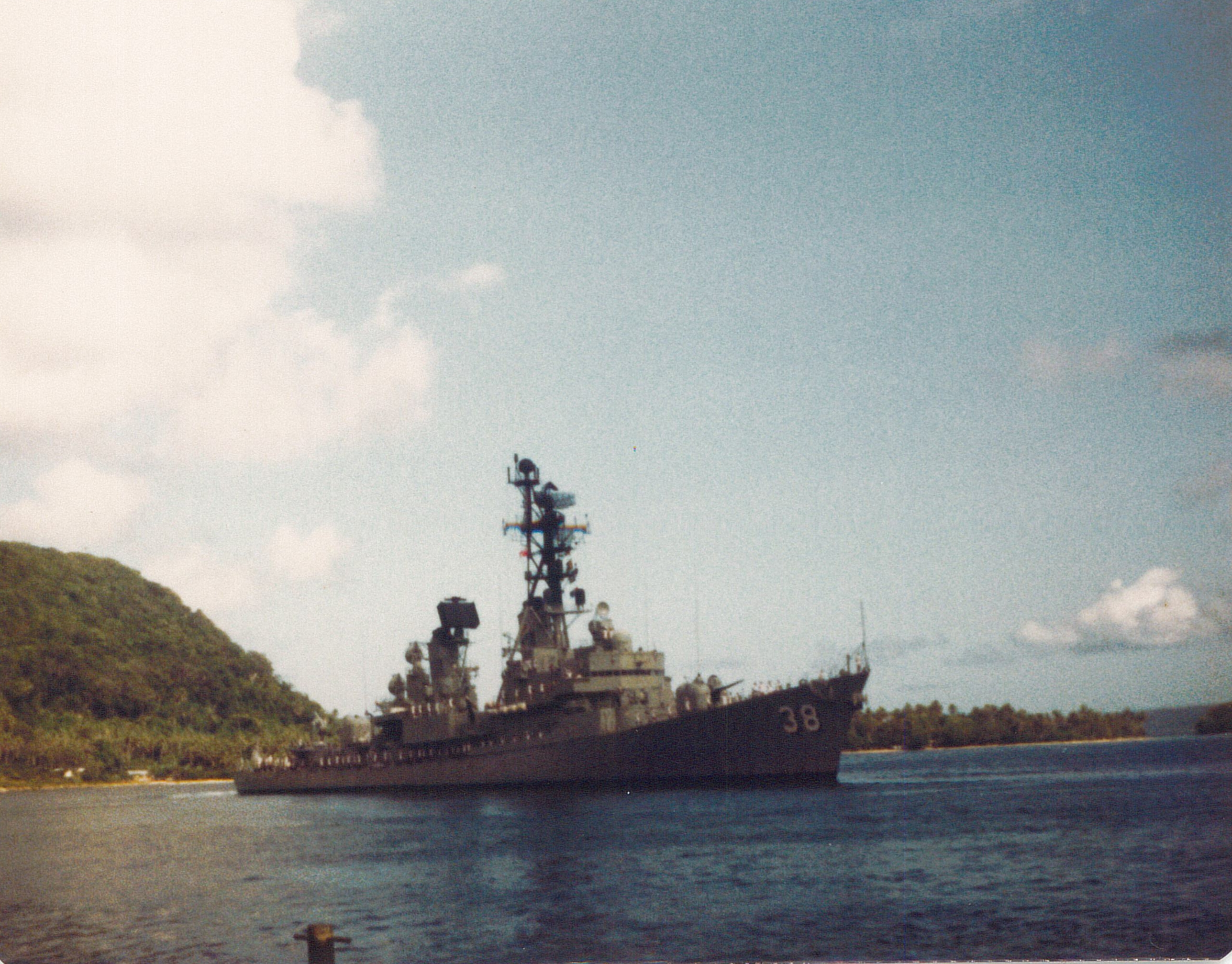
Perth in Port Vila Harbor 1983

At the start of 1981, after returning to Sydney for a five-week break, Perth returned to the Indian Ocean for another, four-and-a-half-month-long deployment. The cruise included numerous port visits and three crossing the line ceremonies. Later in the year, she participated in Exercise Kangaroo 81. In March 1982, the destroyer was deployed to the Indian Ocean for the third time, this time for five months. Perth was docked in Sydney for refit between April 1983 and July 1984, and spent the rest of the year on training exercises. In 1985, following the cancellation of ANZUS exercises after New Zealand withdrew from the treaty, Perth participated in their replacement, Exercise Flying Fish. Later in the year, she was deployed to South-east Asia, before returning to Sydney for maintenance and leave.

In early 1986, Perth, along with several other ships, visited Hobart prior to participation in Exercise Tasman Sea as part of celebrations for the 75th anniversary of the Australian Navy's foundation. On arriving in Hobart on 7 February, the destroyer accidentally rammed a wharf with her bow, damaging it and the two-storey waterfront building, while narrowly missing a "Welcome" sign. Damage to the ship was not so significant as to prevent participation in the exercise, after which, Perth visited Melbourne. This was the start of a series of port visits by the ship, up the western coast of Australia, to Darwin, then into South-east Asia and the Indian Ocean, before returning via Australia's eastern coast. She spent almost all of 1989 docked for maintenance and upgrades.

=== 1990s ===
In February 1990, after completing post-refit trials, the destroyer sailed to Hobart to act as flagship for the Royal Hobart Regatta. She then sailed to South-east Asia in May, participating in several naval exercises and making port visits throughout the region before returning to Sydney in October.

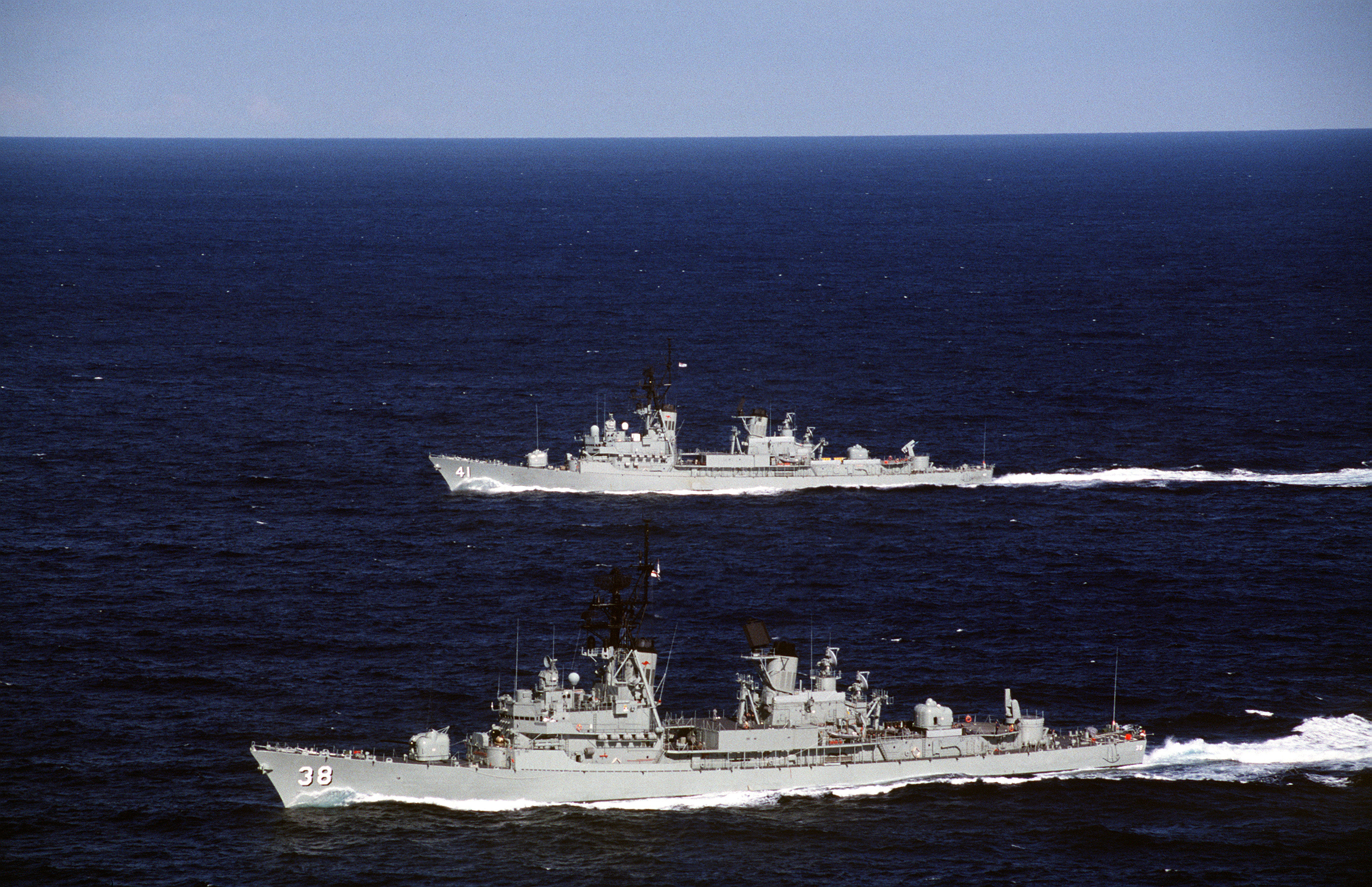
Perth and sister ship Brisbane participating in Exercise Kangaroo 95

During mid-1991, Perth sailed to the Mediterranean via South-east Asia and eastern Africa. She returned to Sydney in August, then spent the rest of the year on training exercises and visits to New Zealand. Early 1990 saw her return to South-east Asia, then operate off the coast of Western Australia before a stint in the South China Sea, returning to Australia in November. The ship spent the early part of 1994 making port visits to western Australia, New Guinea, and New Zealand before docking for refit in June. This did not conclude until the end of March 1995, with the ship sailing to the South China Sea for multinational naval exercises later in the year. In 1996, Perth participated in RIMPAC, before visiting Melbourne for the Melbourne Cup. She returned to Hawaii for another RIMPAC exercise in 1998. 1999 was spent primarily on exercises, along with a deployment to South East Asia, including port visits to Vietnam (for the first time since the war), Guam, Manila, Hong Kong and Singapore. Perth completed a round-Australia voyage during July and August prior to de-commissioning.

== Decommissioning and fate ==
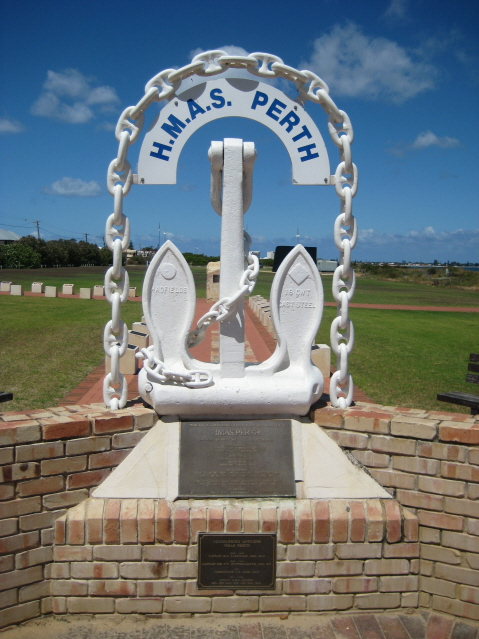
One of the destroyer's anchors preserved at Rockingham Naval Memorial Park

Perth was decommissioned on 15 October 1999. The destroyer was gifted to the Western Australian government in December 1999. She was scuttled as a dive wreck off the coast of Albany, Western Australia, on 24 November 2001.

The original ships' bells of the destroyer Perth and her World War II-era predecessor, the cruiser HMAS Perth (D29), are displayed at the Perth Town Hall.

== Freedoms ==
HMAS Perth was awarded the Freedom of the Following Locations.

- (Australia) 4 March 1966: Perth.

== See also ==
- Non-U.S. recipients of U.S. gallantry awards
