= Rockingham War Memorial =

War memorial in Rockingham, Western Australia

- Australia
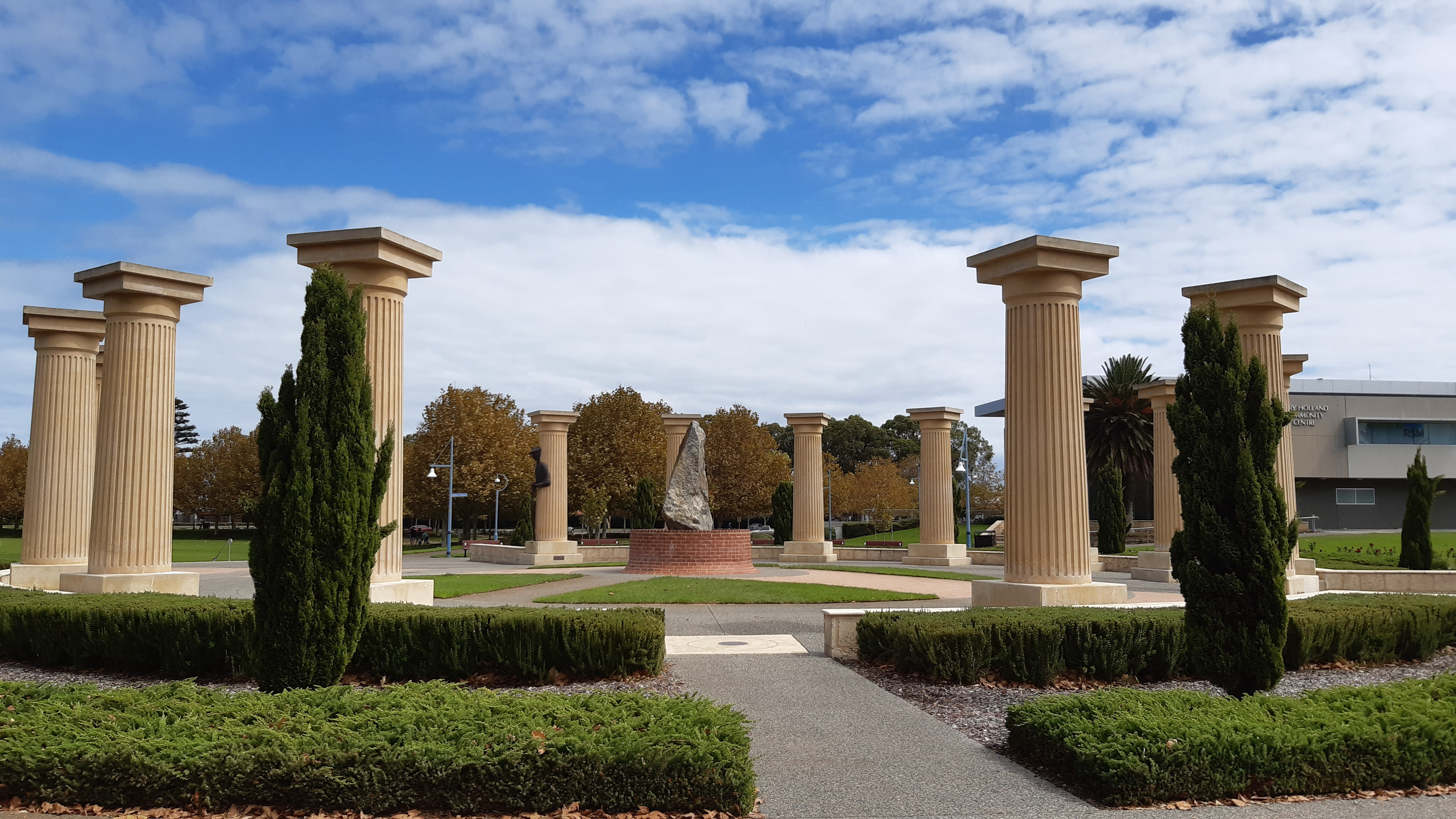
- The Rockingham War Memorial
- For World War I World War II Korean War Vietnam War
- Established: August 13, 2005
- Location: 32.276389°S 115.7322°E; Rockingham, Western Australia

The Rockingham War Memorial is a military memorial in the City of Rockingham, Western Australia, dedicated to what is now the Australian Defence Force.

== Memorial ==
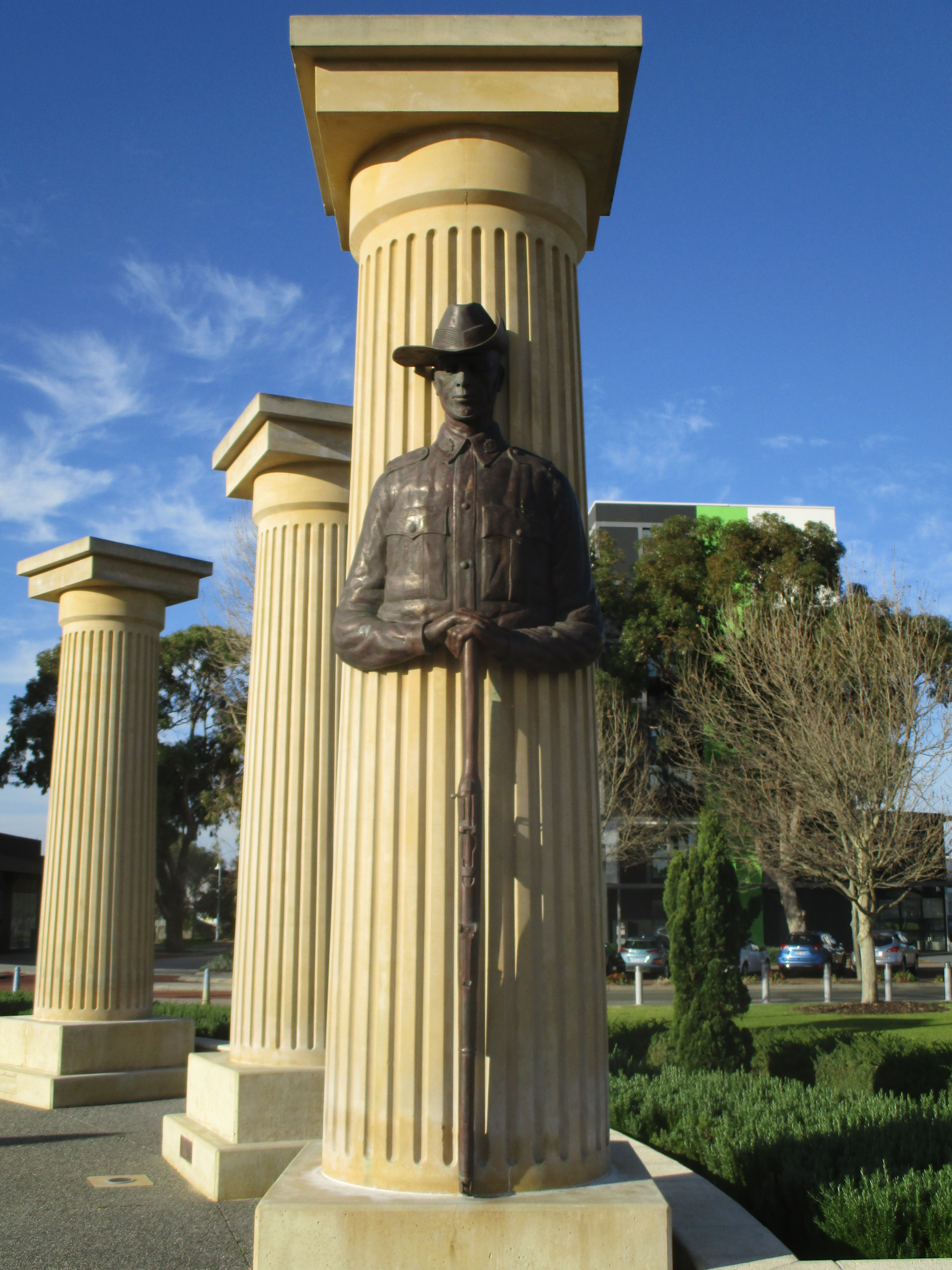
Bronze soldier at the memorial

The monument was dedicated on 13 August 2005 by Mark McGowan, then Western Australian Minister for Tourism, Racing and Gaming, Barry Sammels, Mayor of the City of Rockingham, and Mark Stevens, President of the City of Rockingham RSL Sub-Branch. The dedication took place two days before the 60th anniversary of Victory over Japan Day.

The centre piece of the war memorial was originally located on the opposite side of Flinders Lane but relocated to its current location in 2007, when the area was redeveloped.

The memorials main feature are its fourteen classical styled columns, one for each major conflict Australia participated in. The 5.5-metre-tall (18 ft) columns are arranged in a circle of a diameter of 30 metres (98 ft). A fourteenth column socket has been left empty to commemorate Australian soldiers missing in action. The three branches of the Australian Defence Force, Army, Air Force and Navy, are represented by a QF 25-pounder field gun, a propeller and an anchor. The entrance to the memorial is guarded by two bronze soldiers, created by Perth sculptor Andrew Kay. Each weighs 160 kilograms (350 lb) and is twice the size of a human.

In 2015, a memorial was added to commemorate the centenary of World War One. It displays a Roll of Honour with sixteen names listed of those from the district who served during the war.

Apart from the Rockingham War Memorial, two other major war memorials exist in Rockingham, the Rockingham Naval Memorial Park, dedicated to the Royal Australian Navy, and the Z Special Unit Memorial, in honour of the Z Special Unit.
