= The Two-Man Band =

Australian band (1978-1983)

- Origin: Australia
- Genre: Pop rock
- Years active: 1978–1983
- Label: Fable
- Past members: Mike Brady; Peter Sullivan

The Two-Man Band were an Australian band formed by Mike Brady and Peter Sullivan. They are best known for their number 1 single "Up There Cazaly". The song became the highest selling Australian single ever with sales of over 240,000 as of October 1979.

The band's final release "We're Gonna Grab That Cup" was released for the 1983 America's Cup Campaign.

== Discography ==
=== Singles ===
List of singles, with selected chart positions
Year	Title	Peak chart positions
Year	Title	AUS
1979	"Up There Cazaly" / The Winners March (Instrumental)	1
1980	"You Are Australia" (featuring The Melbourne Singers) / "You Are Australia" (Instrumental)	85
1980	"One Day In September" / "Look Up In The Sky"	33
1981	"There's A Little Bit Of Cazaly In Us All" / "Twenty Five Years In The Outer"	37
1983	"We're Gonna Grab That Cup" / "Hobart (Just A Day Away)"	-

== Awards and nominations ==
=== TV Week / Countdown Awards ===
Countdown was an Australian pop music TV series on national broadcaster ABC-TV from 1974–1987, it presented music awards from 1979–1987, initially in conjunction with magazine TV Week. The TV Week / Countdown Awards were a combination of popular-voted and peer-voted awards.

Year	Nominee / work	Award	Result
1979	"Up There Cazaly"	Most Popular Single	Nominated
