= Post-game show =

Broadcast following a sporting event

A post-game, postgame, or post-match show is a TV or radio presentation that occurs immediately after the live broadcast of a major sporting event. Contents may include:

- replays of key moments in the game.
- interviews with players, coaches and managers.
- analysis of the game by sports commentators.
- footage of celebrating or demoralized fans.
- previews of the next game or series.
- championship and/or MVP trophy presentations.

Postgame shows are generally shorter and less structured than pre-game shows, especially for national broadcasts. In many cases, especially in prime time matchups, there may be virtually no post-game show at all. This is partially due to the unpredictability of the length of a typical sporting event, which can vary in length by a considerable amount depending on clock stoppages and overtime. The post-game show is expected to fill the gap between the end of the game and the start of regularly scheduled programming. A team's success may also portend whether a post-game show is detailed or merely a summary of the box score and highlights.

== See also ==
- Pre-game show
- Halftime show
- Aftershow
