= Mike Brady (musician) =

Australian singer

Mike Brady AM
- Born: Michael Brady; 28 February 1948 (age 78); England
- Occupations: Musician, radio presenter

Michael Brady AM (born 28 February 1948) is an Australian musician, most commonly associated with the Australian rules football anthems "Up There Cazaly", referring to 1910s St Kilda and 1920s South Melbourne player Roy Cazaly, and "One Day in September", which were released by The Two-Man Band. Both songs have become synonymous with Australian rules football and are traditionally sung on AFL Grand Final day in September.

== Biography ==
=== 1948–1977: Early life and early releases ===
Brady was born in England in 1948 and migrated to Australia in the 1950s with his family aboard the Strathnaver. His first job was at the Commonwealth Aircraft Corporation factory in Port Melbourne, Victoria, as a sheet metal worker. He started performing when he was 15 and he was one-third of the 1960s pop act MPD Ltd (which stood for Mike, Pete [Watson] and Danny [Finley]) which had hits in Australia including "Little Boy Sad" and "Lonely Boy". The band toured Australia and the U.K. Brady also toured Vietnam entertaining troops, with a different band which included Wayne Duncan, Gary Howard and country brother and sister act Ricki and Tammy.

After the breakup of MPD Ltd., Brady released two singles which reached the Australian top 50 and sang backing vocals for Renée Geyer's second album It's a Man's Man's World. In the mid-1970s, Brady started his own record company called "Full Moon Records" and a publishing company called "Remix Publishing".

=== 1978–1980: Two-Man Band & "Up There Cazaly" ===
In 1978, The Mojo Singers had reached the top of the Australian charts with the single "C'mon Aussie C'mon" which had been written to promote World Series Cricket, shown on Channel Nine. Seven Network reached out to Brady to write a jingle for the Victorian Football League (VFL), which Brady wrote "Up There Cazaly", referencing footballer Roy Cazaly. He worked with Pete Sullivan on recording the jingle.

The popularity of the jingle led to the release of the song in July 1979 credited to The Two-Man Band and it reached #1 on the Australian charts in September 1979 and was the most popular single recorded by an Australian artist that year. The song became the highest selling Australian single ever with sales of over 240,000 as of October 1979 and 260,000 as of the end of 1980.

The Two-Man Band released a further three top 100 singles in 1980 and 1981.

=== 1981–present: Continued success ===
In July 1981, Brady released, Mike Brady Presents: The Songs of Football's Greatest, an album referencing numerous VFL players. the album peaked at number 44 on the ARIA Charts.

In 1982 Brady wrote "You're Here to Win" as the theme song for the 1982 Commonwealth Games.

Brady has continued to work in advertising, writing jingles such as "Dodo, Dodo, internet that flies" for Dodo Internet and "Lucky you're with AAMI".

In 1987, Brady recorded versions of all of the VFL team's theme songs for an album in 1987. Brady also co-wrote and produced another popular AFL (Australian Football League) jingle, "That's What I Like About Football", sung by Greg Champion.

In 2003, "Up There Cazaly" was reworked as "Up There Australia" to show support for Australian troops in the War of Iraq in 2003.

In addition to his jingle writing and performing, Brady spent 17 years at Melbourne radio station 3AW, where he hosted Mike to Midnight on Saturday nights from 6pm to midnight during the non‑football season. The program was axed in September 2019 as the station shifted in a new direction. During his time at 3AW, he also occasionally filled in on other programs, including Nightline.

Brady is also the chairman of Cogmetrix, a predictive people analytics company that uses cognitive neuroscience software for talent management; recruitment, productivity and organisational development.

Brady has for a number of years sung the Australian national anthem before the start of the Puffing Billy Great Train Race in Belgrave.

== Community and charity work ==
Brady is a board member on the Prostate Cancer Foundation Australia Victorian Board and has performed at many men's health events. He has been a board director of Variety Victoria and is a Life Member of the organisation.

Brady is a patron of the Bali Children Foundation and the Australian Huntington's Disease Association (Vic), and is involved with the Bluearth Foundation, Melbourne Legacy and the Yooralla Society. He is also an Australia Day ambassador.

== Discography ==
=== Studio albums ===
List of albums, with selected details and chart positions
Title	Album details	Peak chart positions
Title	Album details	AUS
Invisible Man	Released: 1979; Label: Full Moon (FML 1001)	—
Mike Brady Presents: The Songs of Football's Greatest	Released: July 1981; Label: Full Moon (FML 12003)	44
Country to Country	Released: 17 July 2007; Label: Bradyworks (BW01)	—
Bloodlines (The Australian Irish Story)	Released: 19 October 2014; Label: Full Moon (FMRBLOO1)	—

=== Extended plays ===
List of EPs, with selected details
Title	EP details
Up There Mike Brady	Released: 1982; Label: Full Moon Records (BIG 1)

=== Singles ===
List of singles, with selected chart positions
Year	Title	Peak chart positions	Album
Year	Title	AUS	Album
1970	"Finger Poppin'" / "Big White Bird"	76	Non-album singles
1970	"Sympathy"	42	Non-album singles
1971	"Oh Lord, Why Lord"	50	Non-album singles
1972	"Hello Mum"	—	Non-album singles
1981	"The Cube" / "The Headless Horsemen"	—	
1982	"You're Here to Win"	49	
1988	"We'll Be There"	—	
1995	"The Diggers Legacy (How Could We Forget)"	—	Non-album singles
1998	"Courage in Their Eyes"	—	Non-album singles
1999	"Up There Cazaly '99" (with Haley White)	78	Non-album singles
2014	"Up There Cazaly" (re-release)	—	Non-album singles
2017	"Come My Children" (live - featuring Russell Morris)	—	Non-album singles
2018	"This Place"	—	Non-album singles
2019	"When I Was Young"	—	Non-album singles

=== See also ===
- The Two-Man Band

== Honours and awards ==
In the 2013 Queens Birthday Honours List, Mike Brady was made a member of the Order of Australia (AM) "For significant service to the community, and to music as a composer and performer". In 2017 he was named Victorian of the Year by the Victoria Day Council.

=== TV Week / Countdown Awards ===
Countdown was an Australian pop music TV series on national broadcaster ABC-TV from 1974 to 1987, it presented music awards from 1979 to 1987, initially in conjunction with magazine TV Week. The TV Week / Countdown Awards were a combination of popular-voted and peer-voted awards.

Year	Nominee / work	Award	Result
1979	himself	Most Outstanding Achievement	Nominated
