= Rockingham Naval Memorial Park =

Naval memorial in Western Australia

- Australia
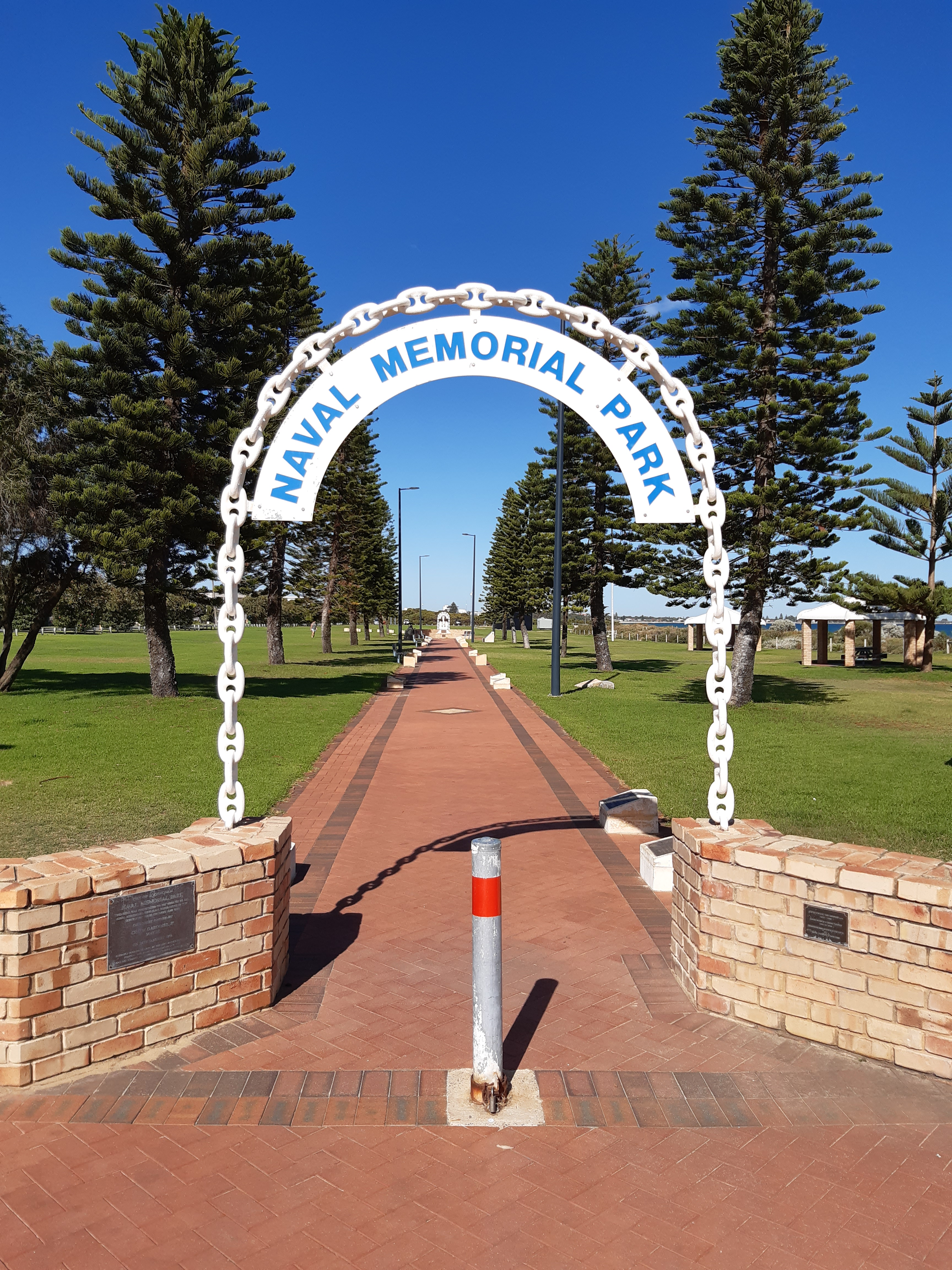
- Looking south from the entrance of the memorial
- For World War II Korean War Vietnam War
- Established: 24 January 1996
- Location: 32.2622°S 115.7453°E; Rockingham, Western Australia

Rockingham Naval Memorial Park is a military memorial in Rockingham, Western Australia, dedicated to the Royal Australian Navy. It contains a number of commemorative plaques, a 110-millimetre (4.5 in) gun turret from HMAS Derwent and a submarine fin from HMAS Orion.

The memorial was dedicated on 24 January 1996 by the mayor of the City of Rockingham, F. W. Gardiner. The project was jointly-funded by the City of Rockingham, the Australian federal government, the Western Australian state government and the Naval Association of Australia.

Apart from the Rockingham Naval Memorial Park, there are two other war memorials in Rockingham, the Rockingham War Memorial and a commemoration of the Z Special Unit, supplemented by a collection of plaques for individual vessels mounted on the Palm Beach Jetty.

== Memorial ==
The memorial consists of three main parts, a walk way with commemorative plaques, the Orion fin and the Derwent gun turret.

=== HMAS Orion fin ===
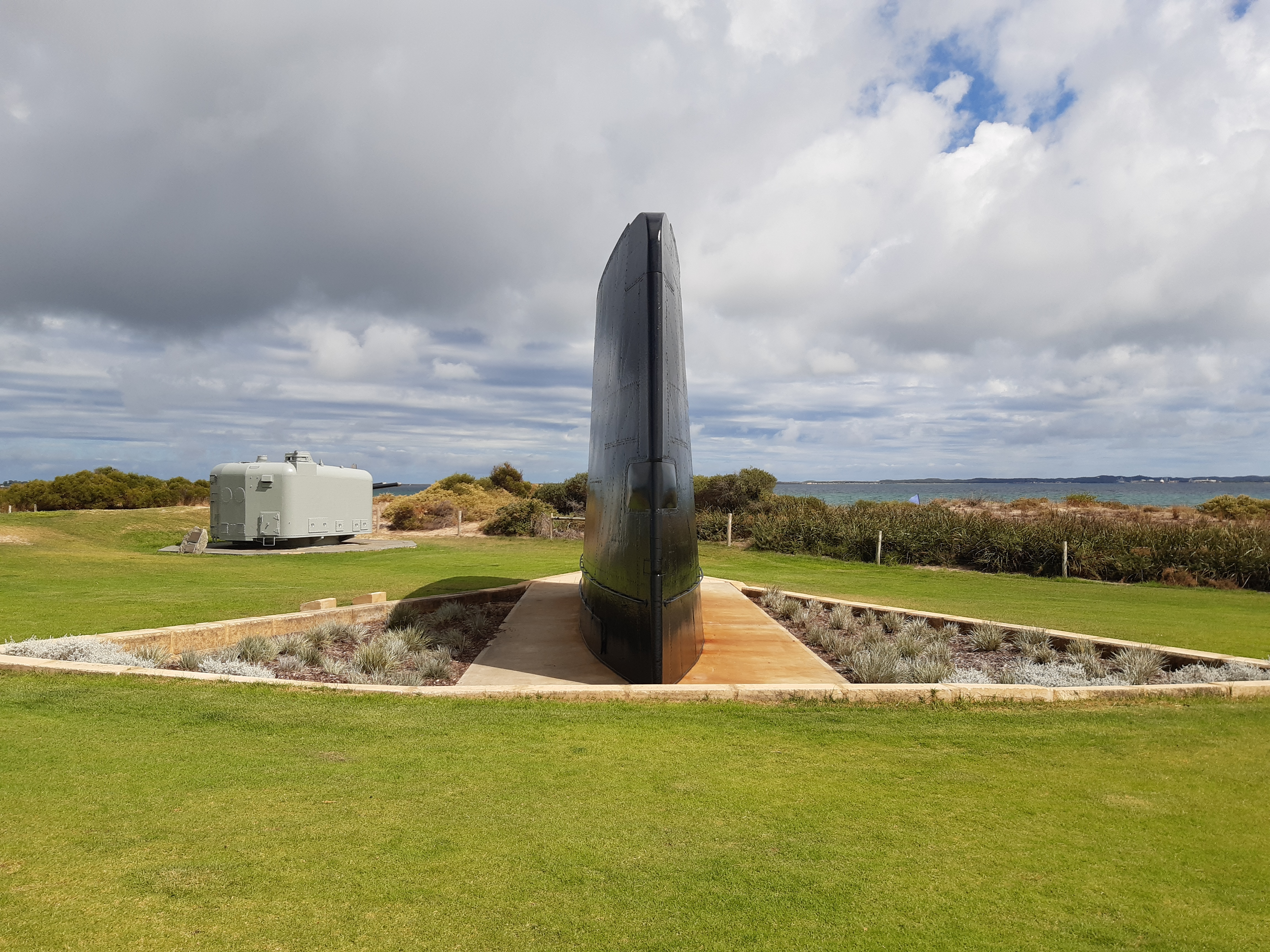
The HMAS Orion fin in 2020

HMAS Orion (S 61) was one of six Oberon-class submarines of the Royal Australian Navy. Orion was in service from 1977 to 1996. The submarine was eventually broken up for scrap in 2006. The fin of the Orion was placed in the Naval Memorial Park, while the port propeller was donated to the WA Maritime Museum.

On 3 August 2017, a commemoration of the 30th anniversary of the loss of Able Seaman Hugh Marcrow and Seaman Damien Humphreys from HMAS Otama was held at the memorial. Markcrow and Humphreys were lost when the submarine Otama dived off the New South Wales coast on 3 August 1987; their bodies were never recovered.

An inaugural Australian Lost Submariners Memorial Service was held by The Submarines Association of Australia in August 2019 at the Orion fin, attended by more than 200 current and former submariners. The event commemorated the submariners who lost their lives since the establishment of the modern Australian Submarine Force in 1967.

=== HMAS Derwent gun turret ===
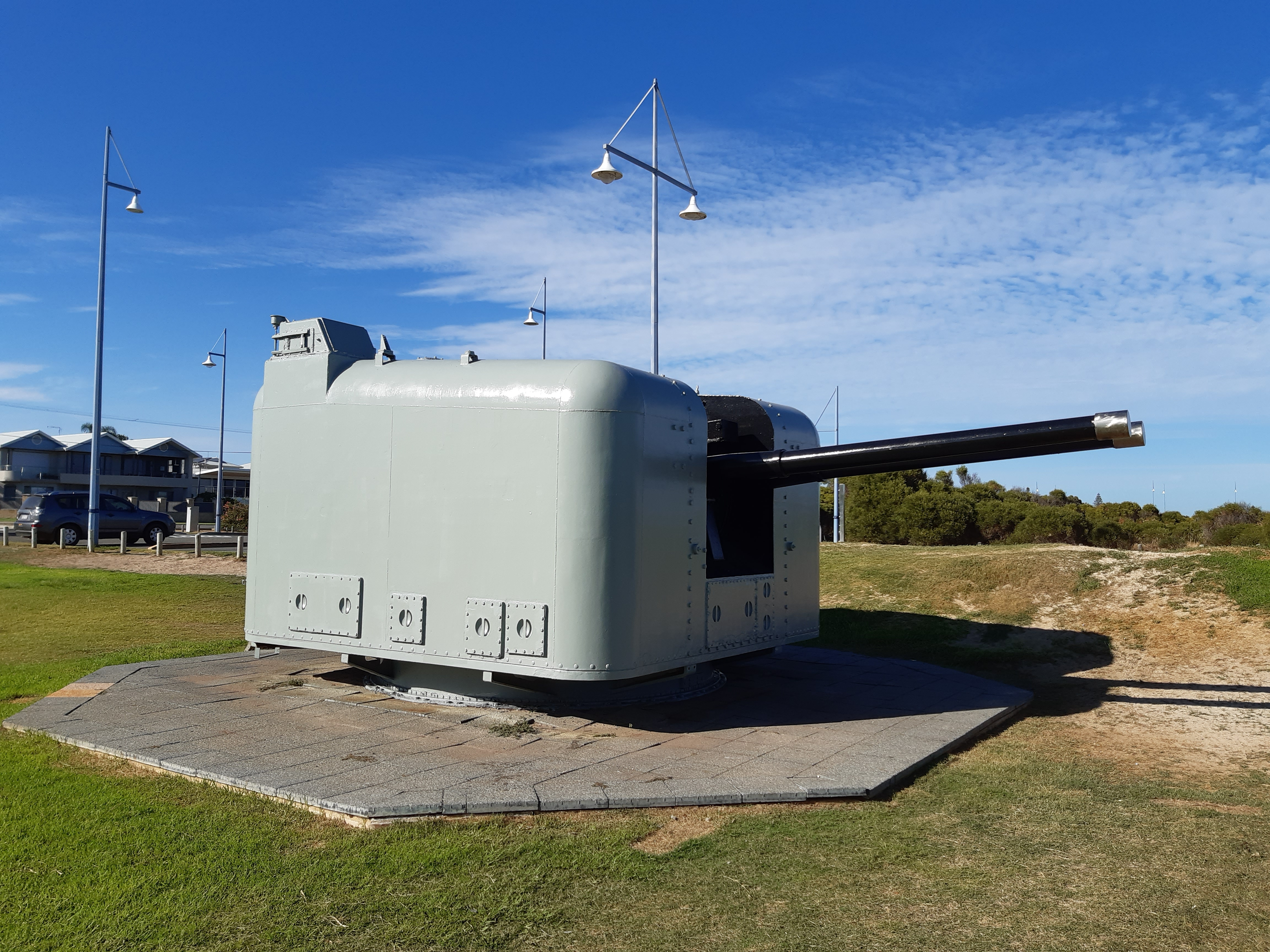
The HMAS Derwent gun turret in 2020

HMAS Derwent (DE 49) was a River-class destroyer escort of the Royal Australian Navy, in service from 1964 to 1994. Derwent was towed to deep water off Rottnest Island and scuttled on 21 December 1994. The ship's sole 4.5-inch gun turret was preserved and placed at the Naval Memorial Park, facing HMAS Stirling.

The installation of the turret at this location pre-dates the official opening of the Naval Memorial Park, having taken place in June 1995.

=== Plaques ===
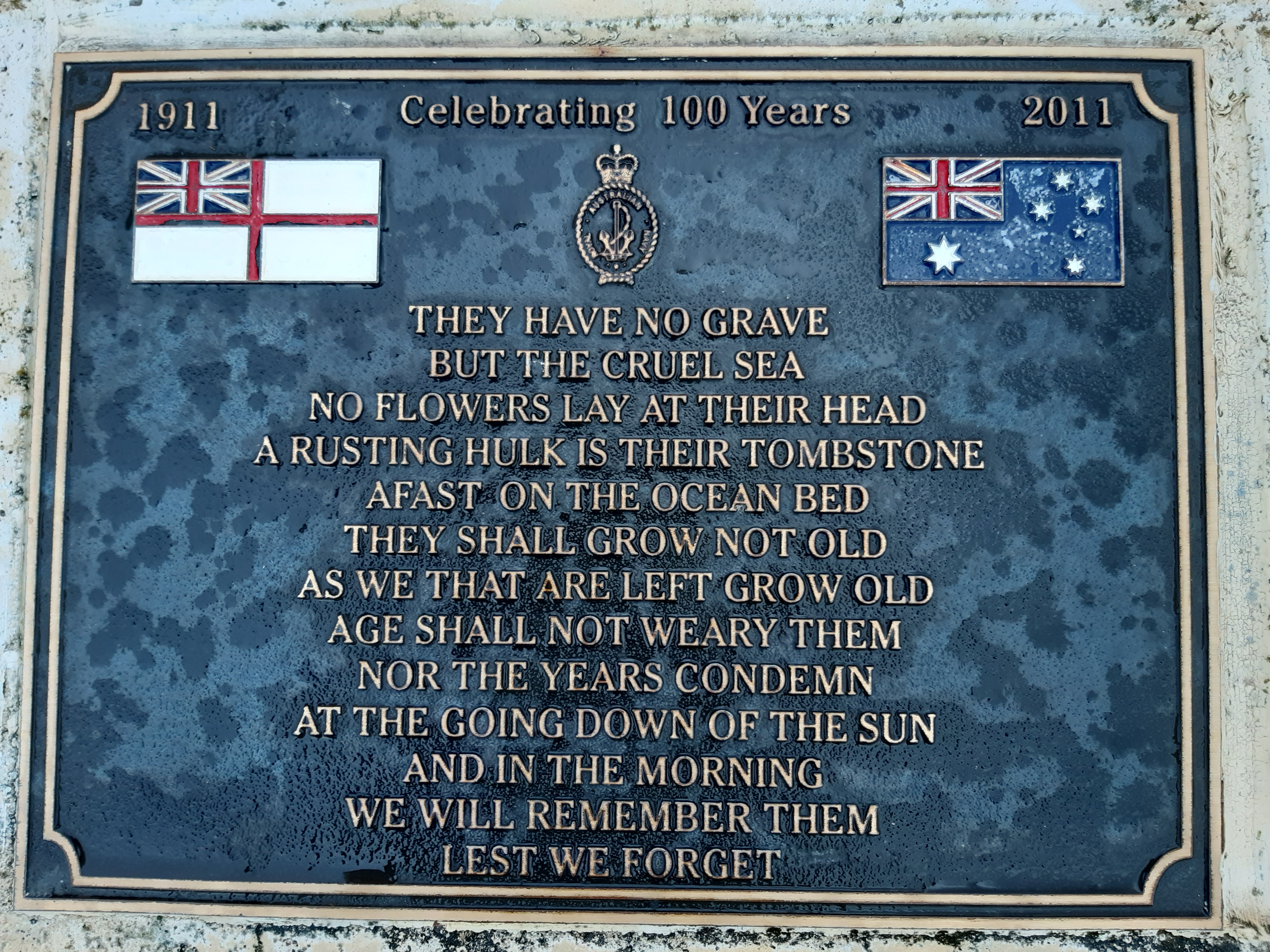
Plaque to commemorate the 100th anniversary of the Royal Australian Navy in 2011

The Naval Memorial Park contains, as of 2020, over 80 plaques commemorating the Royal Australian Navy and its activities during World War II, the Korean War and the Vietnam War.
