= Fred Fleiter =

Australian rules footballer and coach

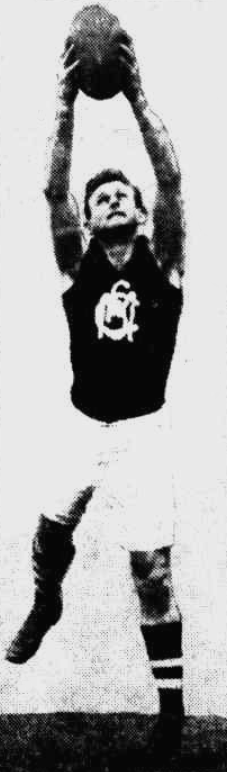

Personal information
- Full name: Manfred Joseph Fleiter
- Born: 3 May 1897; Carlton North, Victoria
- Died: 10 January 1973 (aged 75); Albert Park, Victoria
- Original team: Albert Park
- Height: 183 cm (6 ft 0 in)
- Weight: 86 kg (190 lb)

Playing career^{1}
Years	Club	Games (Goals)
1919–1925	South Melbourne	71 (11)

Coaching career
Years	Club	Games (W–L–D)
1929	South Melbourne	14 (6–8–0)
- ^{1} Playing statistics correct to the end of 1925.

Fred "Skeeter" Fleiter (3 May 1897 – 10 January 1973) was an Australian rules footballer who played for South Melbourne in the Victorian Football League (VFL).

== Football ==
Fleiter played as a ruck-rover and made his league debut in 1919. He played his career beside ruckman Roy Cazaly and is credited with coming up for the famous phrase "Up there, Cazaly!". It was used as a signal to signify that Cazaly was free to run through and leap for the ball.

He played his last game for South Melbourne in 1925 but returned four years later as a non-playing coach for a season.
