= Jack Holt (musician) =

Australian musician

- Birth name: John Angus Holt
- Also known as: Jock Cheese
- Genres: Alternative rock
- Instrument(s): Vocals, guitar, bass
- Years active: 1982–2004, 2018–present
- Labels: David Roy Williams Entertainment, genre b.goode, Shock Records
- Member of: The Collaborators, TISM

John Angus "Jack" Holt, also known by his alias Jock Cheese, is an Australian musician primarily known for being a founding member and bassist of Melbourne alternative band TISM. Holt's band The Collaborators released their self-titled debut album in 2019 after a crowdfunding campaign.

== History ==
=== Early years ===
According to an interview with Holt in 2018, he began his musical career when he was very young, being taught to play piano by his music teacher. After his teacher realised he "[was] not into [piano]", she gave him a ukulele to play. She later taught him guitar. In 1982, Holt met Damian Cowell and Eugene Cester. Seeing that Holt played guitar, the three formed TISM together. The band needed a bass player, so he switched from guitar to bass, a decision he was not happy with.

=== TISM (1982–2004) (2022–present) ===
Holt was a founding member of TISM, a pseudonymous alternative rock band formed in Melbourne in 1982. He performed under the pseudonym "Jock Cheese" as a bassist, guitarist and backing vocalist. TISM produced "over 100 songs", and in December 1983 performed their first concert in Murrumbeena, Melbourne. The gig was considered by the band as a "commercial and artistic failure", causing the band to briefly break up. TISM reformed in 1984, bringing on vocalist Peter Minack and releasing a self titled demo album.

TISM continued releasing records to small-scale success, briefly signing with Phonogram Records in 1991, with guitarist Leak Van Vlalen leaving the band and being replaced by Tokin' Blackman. In 1995, Machiavelli and the Four Seasons was released to commercial success, winning the ARIA award for best independent release.

The band continued performing and releasing albums under independent label Shock Records until 2004, when the band performed at the Earthcore festival and split shortly thereafter.

TISM were quiet for near two decades, with re-release campaigns in the meantime, until June 2022, when the band announced their reunion. In December of the same year, they performed three shows at the Goodthings festival, with Holt as bassist.

=== Jock Cheese (2002–2003) ===
In 2002, Holt released his solo album, "Platter", with some tracks co-written by Damian Cowell and Peter Minack of TISM, under his pseudonym Jock Cheese.

=== The Collaborators (2018–present) ===
In 2018, Holt announced a new band with musician Matt Jeffrey, The Collaborators, and started a crowdfunding campaign on Pozible for a self-titled debut album. The campaign raised AU$7500 of the $7400 required by the end of the year, and the album was released in October 2019. The band performed live for an album launch on 26 October at the Gasometer Hotel, Collingwood.

== Discography ==
=== Jock Cheese ===
Title	Details
Platter	Released in 2002; Nineteen track solo album; Two singles
I Done It With The Drama Teacher	Released in 2002; Single
Tasting Menu From The Album Platter	Released in 2002; Four track promotional CD
Piss In My Pocket	Released in 2002; Single
Blue Vein & Triple Cream From The Album Platter	Released in 2002; Four track promotional CD
Free Britney	Released in December 2021; Single with 6 versions of "Thou Shalt Not Britney Spear" from De RigueurMortis sung by Holt

=== The Collaborators ===
Title	Details
The Collaborators	Written from 2016 to 2018; Released October 2019; 11 track debut album
