= HMAS Orion =

1977–1996 Oberon-class submarine of the Royal Australian Navy

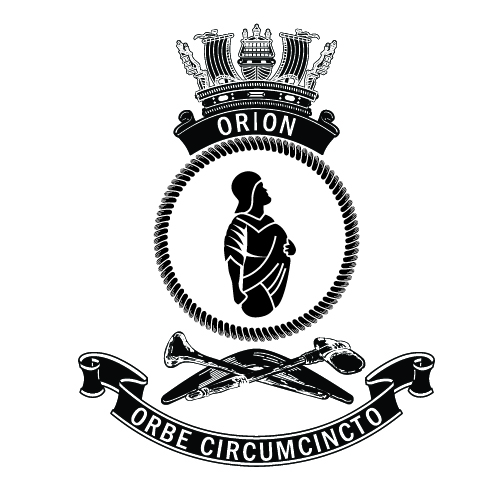

History

Australia
- Namesake: The constellation Orion
- Builder: Scotts Shipbuilding and Engineering Company
- Laid down: 6 October 1972
- Launched: 16 September 1974
- Commissioned: 15 June 1977
- Decommissioned: 4 October 1996
- Home port: HMAS Platypus, New South Wales
- Motto: Orbe Circumcincto; Latin: "All around the world"
- Fate: Sold for scrap 2006

General characteristics
- Class & type: Oberon-class submarine
- Displacement: 1,610 tons standard; 2,030 tons surfaced; 2,410 tons submerged
- Length: 295.2 ft (90.0 m)
- Beam: 26.5 ft (8.1 m)
- Draught: 18 ft (5.5 m)
- Propulsion: 2 × Admiralty Standard Range supercharged V16 diesel generators; 2 × English Electric motors; 3,500 bhp, 4,500 shp; 2 shafts
- Speed: 12 knots (22 km/h; 14 mph) surfaced; 17 knots (31 km/h; 20 mph) submerged; 11 knots (20 km/h; 13 mph) at snorkel depth
- Range: 9,000 nautical miles (17,000 km; 10,000 mi) at 12 knots (22 km/h; 14 mph)
- Test depth: 200 metres (660 ft)
- Complement: As launched: 8 officers, 56 sailors; At decommissioning: 8 officers, 60 sailors
- Sensors & processing systems: Sonar: Atlas Elektronik Type CSU3-41 bow array; BAC Type 2007 flank array; Sperry BQG-4 Micropuffs rangefinding array; Sonartech PIPRS intercept processor; Radar: Kelvin Hughes Type 1006
- Electronic warfare & decoys: Telegon radar and communications intercept
- Armament: Torpedo tubes: 6 × 21-inch (53 cm) bow tubes; 2 × short-length 21-inch (53 cm) stern tubes (later removed); 1996 payload: Mix of 20: Mark 48 Mod 4 torpedoes; UGM-84 Sub Harpoon missiles
- Notes: =

HMAS Orion (S 61) was an Oberon-class submarine of the Royal Australian Navy (RAN). One of six submarines ordered by the RAN during the 1960s, Orion, named after the constellation in a break from ship-naming tradition, was built in Scotland and commissioned in 1977. Orion was one of two Oberon-class submarines designed for intelligence gathering and conducted regular patrols in Soviet, Indian and Chinese waters to gather information regarding enemy capabilities.

Orion was decommissioned in 1996, marked for disposal in 2003, and broken up for scrap in 2006. Several sections of the submarine remain intact as memorials and museum pieces.

== Design and construction ==
The Oberon class was based heavily on the preceding Porpoise class of submarines, with changes made to improve the vessels' hull integrity, sensor systems, and stealth capabilities. Eight submarines were ordered for the RAN, in two batches of four. The first batch was approved in 1963, and the second batch (including Orion) was approved during the late 1960s, although two of these were cancelled before construction started in 1969, with the funding redirected to the Fleet Air Arm. This was the fourth time the RAN had attempted to establish a submarine branch.

The submarine was 295.2 feet (90.0 m) long, with a beam of 26.5 feet (8.1 m), and a draught of 18 feet (5.5 m) when surfaced. At full load displacement, she displaced 2,030 tons when surfaced, and 2,410 tons when submerged. The two propeller shafts were each driven by an English Electric motor providing 3,500 brake horsepower and 4,500 shaft horsepower; the electricity for these was generated by two Admiralty Standard Range supercharged V16 diesel generators. The submarine could travel at up to 12 knots (22 km/h; 14 mph) on the surface, and up to 17 knots (31 km/h; 20 mph) when submerged, had a maximum range of 9,000 nautical miles (17,000 km; 10,000 mi) at 12 knots (22 km/h; 14 mph), and a test depth of 200 metres (660 ft) below sea level. When launched, the boat had a company of 8 officers and 56 sailors, but by the time she decommissioned, the number of sailors had increased to 60. In addition, up to 16 trainees could be carried. A small number of non-RAN personnel, most often from the Defence Signals Directorate, were also present during some intelligence gathering missions.

The main armament of the Oberons consisted of six 21-inch (533.4 mm) torpedo tubes. The British Mark 8 torpedo was initially carried by the submarine; this was later replaced by the wire-guided Mark 23. Between 1977 and 1985, the Australian Oberons were upgraded to carry United States Navy Mark 48 torpedoes and UGM-84 Sub Harpoon anti-ship missiles. As of 1996, the standard payload of an Australian Oberon was a mix of 20 Mark 48 Mod 4 torpedoes and Sub Harpoon missiles. Some or all of the torpedo payload could be replaced by Mark 5 Stonefish sea mines, which were deployed through the torpedo tubes. On entering service, two stern-mounted, short-length 21-inch (53 cm) torpedo tubes for Mark 20 anti-submarine torpedoes were fitted. However, the development of steerable wire-guided torpedoes made the less-capable aft-firing torpedoes redundant; they were closed off, and later removed during a refit.

Orion was laid down by Scotts Shipbuilding and Engineering Company at Greenock, Scotland on 6 October 1972, launched on 16 September 1974, and commissioned into the RAN on 15 June 1977. The submarine was due to enter service in 1975, but faulty high-power electrical cabling had been installed in Orion and sister boat Otama; stripping out and replacing the cabling delayed each submarine's construction by two years. The delay meant that the two boats could be fitted with Micropuffs rangefinding sonar during construction, and have additional electronic surveillance equipment installed. Orion's name comes from the constellation Orion: although a name with strong links to the Royal Navy (with six vessels operating as HMS Orion), this was a break from the RAN's traditional use of the names of explorers and pioneers for submarines. The submarine's motto of "Orbe Circumcincto" (Latin for "All around the world") refers to the visibility of the constellation from any point on Earth.

== Operational history ==
Orion was the first ever Australian vessel to visit a German port. On her delivery voyage from Scotland in 1978, Orion recorded communications and any other signals emitted from Libyan Navy vessels around the ports of Tripoli, Benghazi, Darnah and Tobruk at the request of the United Kingdom and the United States.

As Orion and Otama were fitted with specialist intelligence gathering equipment, they were regularly deployed on surveillance and spying operations, earning them the nickname "Mystery Boats". Activities were part of the broader Western nations' intelligence-gathering apparatus, and included surveillance off the coasts of China, India, Vietnam, and Indonesia, tailing of Soviet Pacific Fleet units during operations in the Pacific and Indian Oceans, and observation off the Soviet base at Vladivostok. These activities continued until the end of the Cold War in 1992, and most of Orion's activities and deployments during this period remain classified. The first captain of Orion, Commander Rob Woolrych MBE, stated that Orion and Otama conducted sixteen intelligence-gathering missions during their service between March 1978 to December 1992. Each mission was under the command of the Chief of the Defence Force, authorised by the Minister for Defence and conducted with the knowledge of the Prime Minister. Regular patrols were conducted for six to eight weeks. On occasion, Orion and Otama would dock in British naval facilities in Singapore or Hong Kong for refuelling and maintenance.

Orion and Otama would remain just off the horizon—around five nautical miles from a target—at periscope depth to observe surroundings and record information during operations close to enemy waters. Batteries which powered the submarines would be recharged during the night and intelligence gathering took place during daylight hours. The submarine was equipped with passive sonar hydrophones which allowed it to record signatures from Soviet vessels, identifying the capabilities of each individual vessel.

On 27 September 1980, the officers and crew of Orion were granted the Freedom of the City of Wollongong in perpetuity. In 1987, Orion was awarded the Gloucester Cup, for being the RAN vessel demonstrating the greatest overall efficiency over the previous twelve months. Orion was the last submarine to receive the Cup until 2005, when it was presented to the Collins-class submarine HMAS Rankin. Like a number of other Oberon-class submarines, Orion carried out many special operation deployments during her service which qualified those crew members for the Australian Service Medal, with Special Operations clasp. Conducted between 1978 and 1992, these operations involved intelligence-gathering missions off the coasts of Vietnam, Indonesia, China and India, primarily targeting the Soviet Navy during the Cold War.

== Decommissioning and fate ==
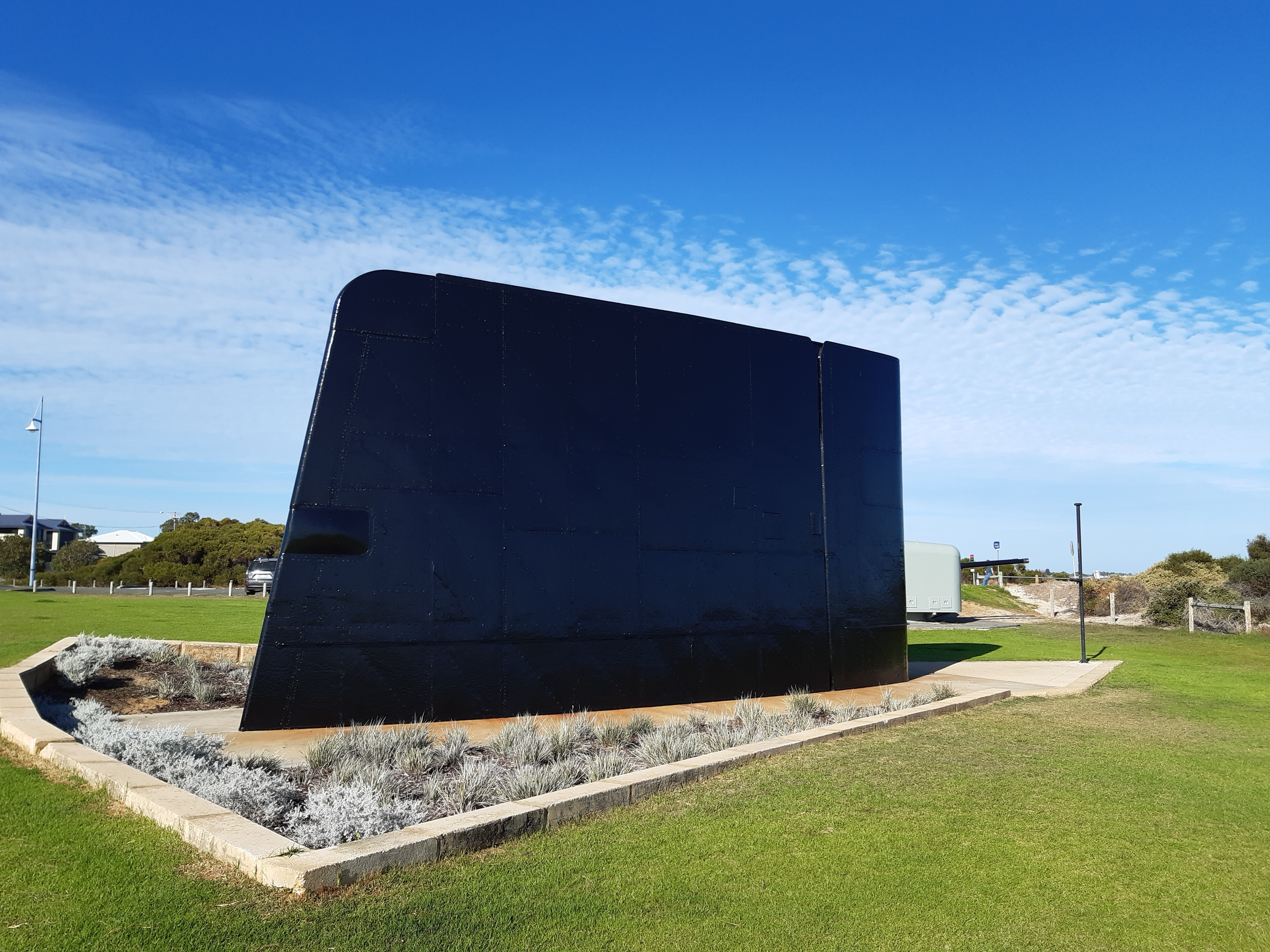
HMAS Orion memorial at Rockingham Naval Memorial Park

Orion paid off into reserve at Garden Island, Western Australia in 1996. She remained there for several years, until she was marked for disposal as scrap in September 2003. Efforts to hand her over to a state government for preservation as a museum ship or sinking as a dive wreck failed, and submissions for disposal companies were closed off on 6 August 2004. The submarine was sold for scrapping, and was broken up by Tenix at Henderson, Western Australia in December 2006. The fin was given to the City of Rockingham and is now mounted as a permanent memorial at Rockingham Naval Memorial Park. The port propeller was donated to the WA Maritime Museum.

In November 2011, authorisation was granted to establish a new Australian Naval Cadets unit in Jindabyne, New South Wales, named New Training Ship (NTS) Orion after the submarine. In addition to the name, the cadet unit will use Orion's badge and motto.
