= Platter (album) =

Studio album by Jock Cheese
- Released: 6 January 2003
- Recorded: 1999–2001
- Studios: The TuckShop, SingSing Studios, The Bunker, Sydney
- Genre: Alternative rock
- Length: 69:31
- Label: Shock Records

Platter is a solo album released by TISM bassist Jock Cheese (a pseudonym for John "Jack" Holt). All the tracks were written by Cheese and fellow TISM members Ron Hitler-Barassi (pseudonym for Peter Minack) and Humphrey B. Flaubert (pseudonym for Damian Cowell). Holt plays all of the instruments on the album, excluding drums, and on one track, classical guitar, which was played by TISM bandmate Tokin' Blackman (pseudonym for James "Jock" Paull).

Platter features the social commentary and satire that is also prominent in TISM's works, including satirical references to Christopher Skase, Josh Abrahams and Robert Palmer.

The songs "I Done It with the Drama Teacher" and "Piss in My Pocket" were released as singles, with other tracks from the album as B-sides, to promote the album, while Holt would go on tour with a backing band, Jock Cheese and the Crackers, in 2003. The seven "Just the Straight Dope" tracks are shortened instrumental versions of tracks from the album.

An excerpt of "Unfair" was used as an unlisted spoken-word intro to TISM's 2001 album De Rigueurmortis, which preceded Platter, while "Totally Addicted to Skase" was written in 1999.

In 2018, Holt would return after several years as a session musician with a new band, The Collaborators, who released a self-titled album the following year (of note, Stephen "Venom" Brown, who played drums on Platter, also played drums on nine of the album's eleven tracks).

The Collaborators performed their first concert at the Gasometer in Collingwood on 26 October 2019, where they played the entire album along with two tracks from Platter. The band would continue performing throughout the pandemic wherever feasible until 2022, with well-known Melbourne cartoonist Fred Negro joining in on vocals for covers of selected TISM songs. On 10 December 2022, Platter was reissued on limited-edition yellow vinyl through TISM's current label, DRW Entertainment, albeit without the instrumental "Just the Straight Dope" tracks. The album had previously been reissued on digital services in 2020.

== Track listing ==
All tracks are written by John Holt, Peter Minack and Damian Cowell.

No.	Title	Length
1.	"Up There Calisi"	4:03
2.	"Don't Burn 'Em All J.D."	4:51
3.	"La Traviata"	3:27
4.	"Totally Addicted to Skase"	3:37
5.	"I Done It with the Drama Teacher"	3:30
6.	"Dave Graney's Country Idyll"	3:41
7.	""Why Don't You Get A Bigger Set Of Tits?" (Note: Ron mentions in the In Press interview that he wishes to do a solo album: "Yeah, I think so. It would be Wayne Carey reading Helen Garner's The First Stone – Ron Hitler Barassi Presents Wayne Carey Reading Helen Garner's The First Stone. And I'd just be mumbling in the background, 'Grow a bigger set of tits'... I don't think it will sell.")"	4:32
8.	"Friday Night Shakespeare"	4:49
9.	"Unfair"	3:10
10.	"O Great Rabbit in the Sky"	3:32
11.	"Piss in My Pocket"	2:43
12.	"You Guarantee Fame with Two First Names" (The song is 4:04, followed by 1:31 of silence)	5:35
13.	"Just The Straight Dope" (Instrumental) (Don't Burn 'Em All J.D.)	3:43
14.	"Just The Straight Dope" (Instrumental) (Dave Graney's Country Idyll)	3:23
15.	"Just The Straight Dope" (Instrumental) (Piss in My Pocket)	2:38
16.	"Just The Straight Dope" (Instrumental) (Totally Addicted to Skase)	3:00
17.	"Just The Straight Dope" (Instrumental) (La Traviata)	3:12
18.	"Just The Straight Dope" (Instrumental) (Unfair)	2:54
19.	"Just The Straight Dope" (Instrumental) (You Guarantee Fame with Two First Names)	3:10

== Personnel ==
=== Musicians ===
- John "Jack" Holt – vocals, guitar, bass, keyboards, recording
- James "Jock" Paull – classical guitar on "I Done It With the Drama Teacher"
- Laurence Maddy – additional keyboards, recording, mixing on tracks 1, 4, 6, 11–13, 15 and 19
- Stephen "Venom" Brown – drums

=== Technical personnel ===
- Robert Bell – programming
- Stewart Day – editing, mixing on tracks 8, 9 and 18
- Paul McKercher - mixing on tracks 2, 3, 5, 14 and 17
- Kevin Ross - recording, mixing on "Why Don't You Get A Bigger Set Of Tits?"
- Mat Voigt - mixing on "O Great Rabbit In The Sky"
