= One Day in September (song) =

Song by Mike Brady
- Released: 1980
- Genre: Pop
- Songwriter: Mike Brady

"One Day in September" is a song written and performed by Australian musician Mike Brady, released in 1980. The song is a sports anthem associated with Australian rules football, and it specifically refers to the AFL Grand Final – a game which was (and still is) traditionally played on the last Saturday in September. It was renamed for the 2015 AFL Grand Final to "One Day in October" due to the Grand Final then being played on the first Saturday of October.
