= Australian rules football in popular culture =

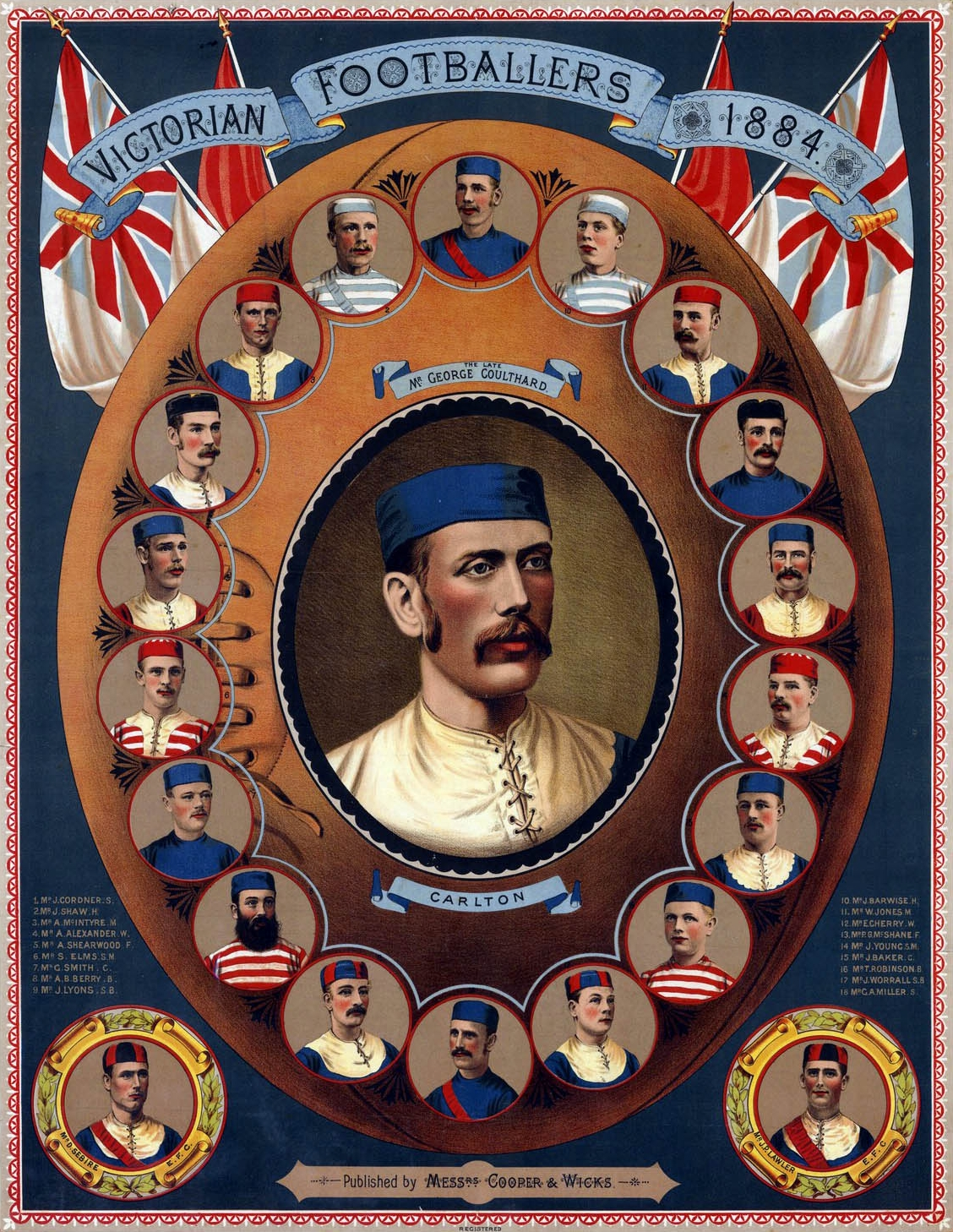
1884 lithograph poster showing star VFA footballers of the day. The central portrait of Carlton's George Coulthard is surrounded by two players from each club, all contained in an oval football.

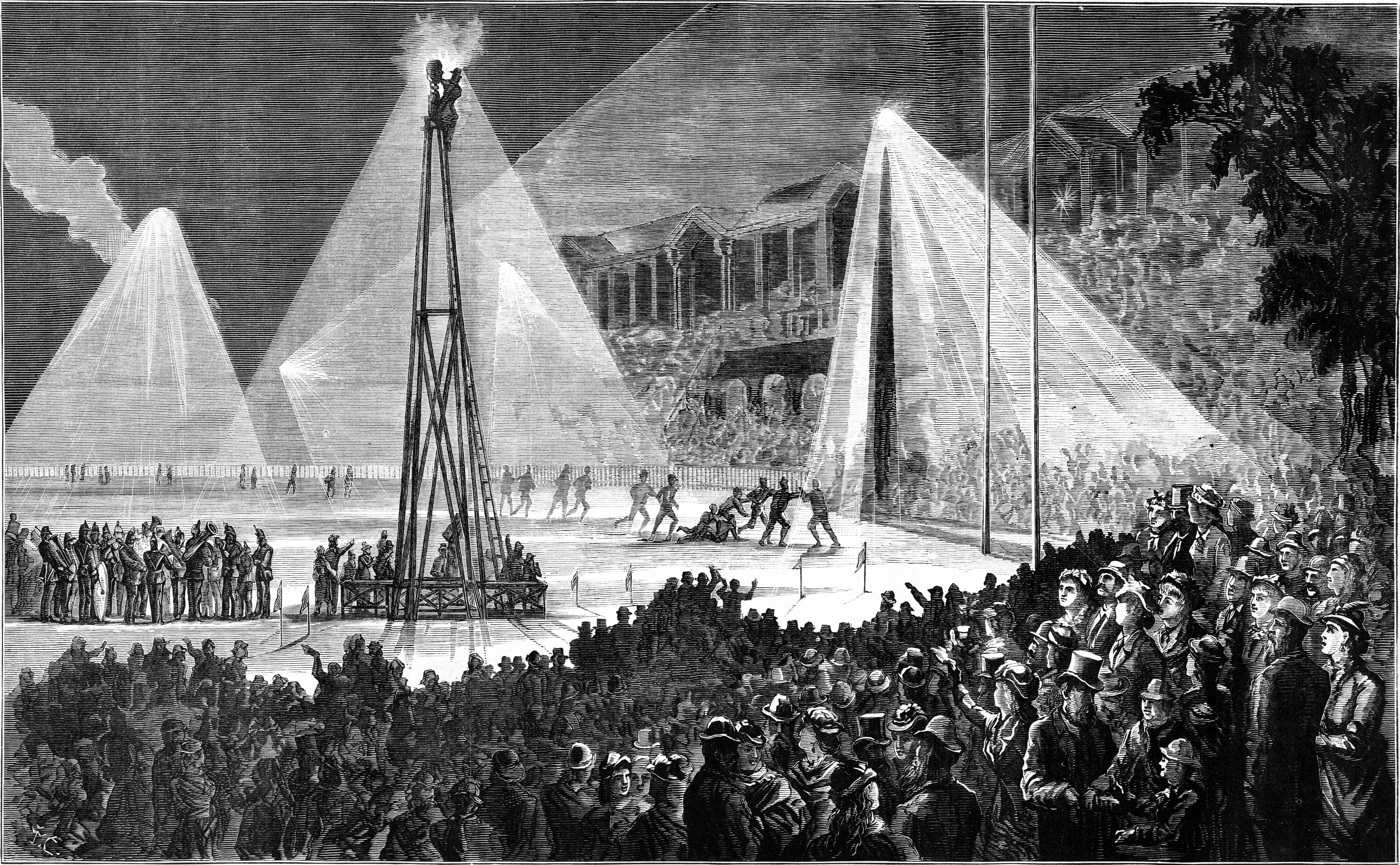
Engraving of a football match played under electric lights at the MCG, printed in the Illustrated Australian News, 1879

Australian rules football has had a significant impact on popular culture in its native Australia, capturing the imagination of Australian film, art, music, television and literature.

== Postage ==
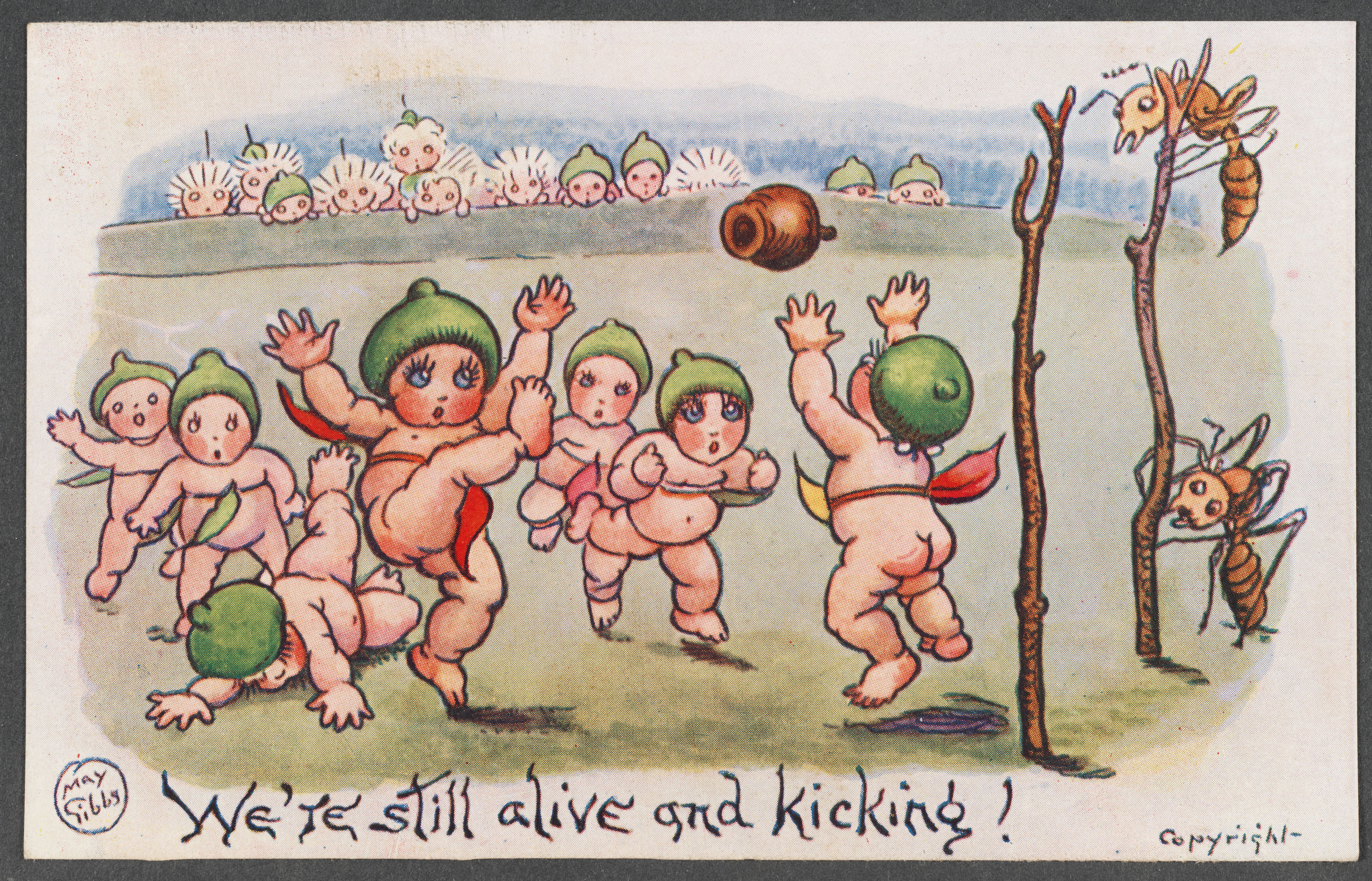
May Gibbs (author of Snugglepot and Cuddlepie) gumnut babies postcard circa 1916

Australian rules is featured on several Australian (and international) postage stamps and postcards, including:

- 1974 – 7-cent stamp featuring players in a marking contest
- 1984 – Ausipex Antigua and Barbuda $5 stamp
- 1989 – 3-cent Australian sports stamp
- 1996 – 45-cent Centenary of the AFL series circulated in 1996 featuring the 16 AFL teams of the day
- 2008 – 50-cent 150 years of Australian Football depicting the first match
- 2009 – 55-cent "Let's Get Active" postage stamp also features a child kicking an Australian Rules ball
- 2012 – Australian Legends of Football, featuring Ron Barassi and Gary Ablett Jr

== Literature ==
Barry Oakley's satiric football novel A Salute to the Great McCarthy was published in 1970.

Crime novelist Kerry Greenwood wrote the 1991 short story The Vanishing of Jock McHale's Hat.

Alan Wearne's 1997 novel Kicking in Danger is about an Essendon player turned private eye who specialises in football-related cases. Football plays a major role in the 1998 novel Deadly, Unna? by Phillip Gwynne. The Call (1998), written by Martin Flanagan, is a semi-fictional account of football pioneer Tom Wills. Set during the 1970s, the 1999 novel Saturday Afternoon Fever by comedian Matthew Hardy follows a boy on weekend trips to VFL games, specifically to see his hero, St Kilda's Trevor Barker. Tony Wilson's debut novel Players (2005) satirises the relationship between football and the media. In 2012, Paul D. Carter won The Australian/Vogel Literary Award for his debut novel Eleven Seasons, a coming-of-age story about a teenager and the role football plays in shaping his identity.

=== Children's books ===
In 2002, Felice Arena and former AFL star Garry Lyon co-wrote the first of many children's books in the Specky Magee series. Other footballers have released football-themed children's books, including Dwayne Russell with Jackson's Goal and Brendan Fevola with The Best Game Ever.

Michael Wagner's Maxx Rumble Footy Series was published between 2004 and 2006.

I Want to Be a Footballer (2007) by field hockey Olympic medalist Sally Carbon follows a football fanatic from his first Auskick game.

=== Poetry ===
Swift as an eagle on the wing
Holds fast the ball, then with a sudden spring
He leaps high in the air and kicks the volume round.
The ball emits a hollow moaning sound.
Obedient to this hero's skillful care,
The football rushes whistling through the air
Then—as a bomb, by blazing powder thrown
High in mid-air, when rapid it has flown
Describes a curving parabola there—
So turns the ball its bending course and fair.
It falls, and far beyond the 'true-blues' base.
With many abound it stops its headlong race.

— Bell's Life in Victoria, 1860, on football pioneer and goalsneak William Hammersley. Fanciful verse of this kind was common in early match reports.

"A Friendly Game of Football" was published in Edward Dyson's first volume of poetry, Rhymes from the Mines and Other Lines, in 1896. Dyson also wrote football poems for Punch. C. J. Dennis wrote "The Barracker" in 1922.

Colin Thiele's 1966 poetry collection In Charcoal and Conte contains "The Oval Barracker". In Bruce Dawe's popular poem "Life Cycle" (1967), the passion Victorians have for football is portrayed, in a gently humorous tone, as a form of religious worship. Dawe describes the transcendent qualities of football in "The High Mark". The poem ends with a footballer falling "back to Earth"—a "guernseyed Icarus". He returned to football with "Stripes and Colours (after Cesar Vallejo)" in 1993.

Hal Colebatch wrote the poem "Lines Written Upon Learning That a Man Had Had His Ashes Buried between the Goal-Posts of a Football Oval" (1973).

Football is a recurring theme in Mark O'Connor's poetry. He published numerous football poems in Quadrant, such as "Melbourne Visit: The Game" (1976) and "For Doug Wade" (1977). In 1991 he published "The 1990 AFL Grand Final in Beijing (for Manning Clark)".

Alan Wearne's 1976 poetry volume New Devil, New Parish begins with the football poem "Go On, Tell Me the Season Is Over". His 2002 poem "Bourke Street on Saturday Night" is written from the perspective of 19th-century Essendon footballer Charlie "Tracker" Forbes.

Philip Hodgins wrote "Country Football" in 1986. His 1990 book A Kick of the Footy contains nine poems on the theme of kicking a football, with titles such as "Flat Punt", "Snap Shot" and "Kicking into Danger".

Michael Leunig wrote "The Absolute Grand Final" in 1992.

Damian Balassone often employs football themes, such as in the poem "The Half-Back Flankers", which appears in the collection Strange Game in a Strange Land:

We strive to run the lines until
the opposition breaks.
Imagination is the name
we give to our mistakes.

== Theatre ==
=== Ballet ===
"If you add the element of danger to dance, then you're getting close to Australian football."

— Martin Flanagan, And the Big Men Dance

Many writers have seen artistic qualities in the physicality of Australian rules football. Historian Manning Clark described the game as "poetry in motion", and compared the aerobic athleticism of the players to that of ballet dancers. Ballet critic John Cargher devoted the introduction of his book Opera and Ballet in Australia (1977) to the aesthetic similarities between ballet and Australian football. The sport has also captured the imagination of ballet dancers and choreographers, influencing major works in the canon of Australian ballet.

Robert Helpmann's 1964 ballet The Display, his first and most famous work for the Australian Ballet, relates the mating dance of the lyrebird to the masculine posturing of Australian men fighting over a girl at a bush picnic. Since Australia had a reputation for athletic prowess, Helpmann decided to make a feature of it, choreographing a football sequence of stylised leaps, marks, bounces and handballs. Helpmann recruited Ron Barassi to coach the male dancers.

Tasmanian choreographer Graeme Murphy explored football in Beyond Twelve (1980). The autobiographical ballet traces a man's life from football-mad youth to adulthood as a renowned dancer. Football is referenced in the dances, costumes and stage designs, including goalposts which symbolically turn into ballet barres.

=== Plays and musicals ===
All Saints' Day is a football-themed musical written by Don Battye and scored by Peter Pinne. The story centres on the St Kilda Football Club's fight for the premiership with subplots involving supporters and a Miss Mascot competition. The musical premiered in 1960 at the National Theatre in St Kilda.

And The Big Men Fly is a football farce in the Australian tall tale tradition, written by Alan Hopgood in 1963. The play's title comes from a phrase used to describe ruckmen contesting a ball-up. Its hero is Achilles Jones ("Acky"), a simple farmhand from Manangatang with "the body of a Greek god" and the ability to kick a bag of wheat ten yards with his bare feet. Lured down to Melbourne to play for an ailing VFL club, Acky is hailed as their greatest player, single-handedly winning matches when roused by made-up stories to make him "fighting mad".

Goodbye Ted, co-authored in 1975 by Jack Hibberd and John Timlin, employs football language in a testimonial to a retiring footballer for larrikin humour and sexual innuendo. In a foreword to the play, academic Don Watson notes that "Goodybye Ted is likely, and was probably calculated, to offend".

The Club was written by David Williamson in 1977. Williamson revisited football with the 2012 play Managing Carmen.

Themes of football under threat from corporatism are explored in Barry Dickins' Royboys (1987). The play follows the battling Nobles, a working-class family of "Royboys" (Fitzroy supporters) who struggle to save their club from being renamed "Fitzaki" and relocated to Japan.

Comedian Damian Callinan's 2000 one man play Sportsman's Night was inspired by the real life events of a regional football club banned by their local league for on and off field violence. Callinan revisited the dysfunctional Bodgy Creek Football Club in the 2010 sequel The Merger. A feature film version was produced in 2018, accompanied by the Bodgy Creek Football Club podcast, and then in 2020 the Bodgy Creek Community Podcast, which included regular updates on Caxton Valley League games.

Holding the Man (2006) is named after the Australian football infringement. It is based on Timothy Conigrave's 1995 autobiography, and was adapted for the stage by Tommy Murphy. It tells the story of Conigrave's love affair with John Caleo, a fellow student at Melbourne's Xavier College and captain of the school football team. A film adaptation was released in 2015.

Glenn Manton's comedy show The Spray (2008) satirises AFL coaching methods.

The lives of several real-life footballers have been dramatised on stage. The Call (2004) is an adaptation by Bruce Myles of Martin Flanagan's 1996 novel of the same name. With football-inspired choreography by Koori dancers, the play explores the life of football pioneer Tom Wills and his relationship with aborigines. Krakouer! depicts the rise of Indigenous footballing brothers Jim and Phil Krakouer. It was developed by playwright Reg Cribb in 2009 from Sean Gorman's 2005 novel Brotherboys.

== Music ==
=== Anthems and novelty songs ===
Many songs inspired by the game have become anthems of the game. Jack O'Hagan wrote "Our Aussie Game" in 1949. Mike Brady's 1979 hit "Up There Cazaly" went on to become Australia's highest selling single. Brady built on its success with "One Day in September" (1980) and numerous other football-themed songs. In 1996, singer-songwriter Kevin Johnson reworked his 1973 hit "Rock and Roll" as "Aussie Rules (I Thank You for the Best Years of Our Lives)". It was the official AFL Centenary song. Models member James Freud performed "One Tony Lockett", an ode to Tony Lockett, at the SCG, and released Today's Legends of AFL Football as James Freud and the Reserves.

Football humorists the Coodabeen Champions have written many songs about the sport since the Coodabeens Footy Show first aired in 1981. Greg Champion, the team's main songwriter, wrote the 1994 hit "That's the Thing About Football". Other titles include "VFL Park in the Dark", "Deep in Our Hearts Everyone Barracks for Fitzroy", "Matty Lloyd Throws Grass in the Air", "Knee Reconstruction" and "Dermott Brereton is a Hood". In 1994, actor Eric Bana released the album Out of Bounds in which he lampoons popular football identities. "Out of Bounds" is also a song by bawdy balladeer Kevin Bloody Wilson, parodying personalities on The Footy Show. In 1981, television's Ugly Dave Gray proposed a new club song with "Come on Fitzroy". Comedian Austen Tayshus released "Footyana" in 1999, a spoken-word single in the style of "Australiana" (1983). "Kicking the Footy with God" by The Bedroom Philosopher is about Gary Ablett Sr. ("God"), released on his 2005 debut album In Bed with My Doona. Sidewinder's Nick Craft penned "It's a Draw" in response to the 2010 AFL Grand Final.

Several footballers have pursued music careers with varying levels of commercial success. Known for his goal-kicking ability and mop-top hairstyle, Peter McKenna, then of Collingwood, was the first VFL star to gain a multimedia profile. He reached the Melbourne music charts in the early 1970s with "Smile All the While" (written by Johnny Young) and "Things to Remember". SANFL legend Graham Cornes released "I Gotta Girl" together with the football-themed B-side "Untying the Laces" in 1977. Twelve VFL players feature on the 1980 LP Footy Favourites. The cover urged fans to "Hear your football stars sing their favourite hits." In 1985, Mark "Jacko" Jackson released the novelty hit single "I'm an Individual". Sydney Swans rival Warwick Capper responded months later with "I Only Take What's Mine". Both songs were panned by critics. Years later the pair performed a duet on the techno song "Rippin' Undies".

=== Popular music ===
I go to the football to cheer for my team,
I go to the football to hear myself scream.

— Dave Warner, "Suburban Boy"

Perth singer Dave Warner's best-known song, "Suburban Boy" (1976), mentions the act of barracking. Cartoon East Fremantle players adorn his 1978 LP Free Kicks; the title track examines sexual relationships using football imagery. Warner's punk band From the Suburbs covered the East Fremantle club song in 1979. "Late One Saturday Afternoon" and live staple "Half-time at the Football" belong to his repertoire of football-themed monologues. He co-wrote songs with Martin Cilia in 2002 about each club of the AFL.

Football references are rife in the output of the anonymous alternative rock band TISM. "The Back Upon Which Jezza Jumped", self-released in 1985, is about Collingwood ruckman Graeme "Jerker" Jenkin, the "pathetic platform" from which Carlton's Alex Jesaulenko took the "Mark of the Century" in the 1970 VFL Grand Final. It was reissued on Gentlemen, Start Your Egos (1991), featuring Ted Whitten on its cover, who is also credited with writing the liner notes to TISM's 1990 LP Hot Dogma. In the early demo "(Jumpin' Jivin') Jimmy "The Ghost" Joyce", Irish novelist James Joyce is recruited to Richmond by Tom Hafey, juxtaposing Joyce's literary work with his on-field feats as a centre half-forward. Frontman Ron Hitler-Barassi likens Jim Morrison fans to the Richmond Cheer Squad in the 1988 diatribe "Morrison Hostel". "Father and Son" on the 1992 EP Beasts of Suburban is written from the viewpoint of a "Sainters" tragic, intensifying with the refrain: "Winmar to Lockett!". TISM's music videos have also referenced football: "Greg! The Stop Sign!!" (1995) was shot at St Kilda's home ground, and "Whatareya?" (1998) shows the band playing football in a parody of Aerobics Oz Style. Their 1997 single "Shut Up – The Footy's on the Radio" was the theme song for Triple M's AFL coverage. Bassist Jock Cheese's 2002 solo album Platter features "Up There Calisi" (a satirical take on "Up There Cazaly"), and "Why Don't You Get a Bigger Set of Tits?", which references a scandal involving Wayne Carey. When asked if TISM were AFL players, Humphrey B. Flaubert said "We're actually not AFL, we're more violent and crappy ... so you're looking at the VFL there."

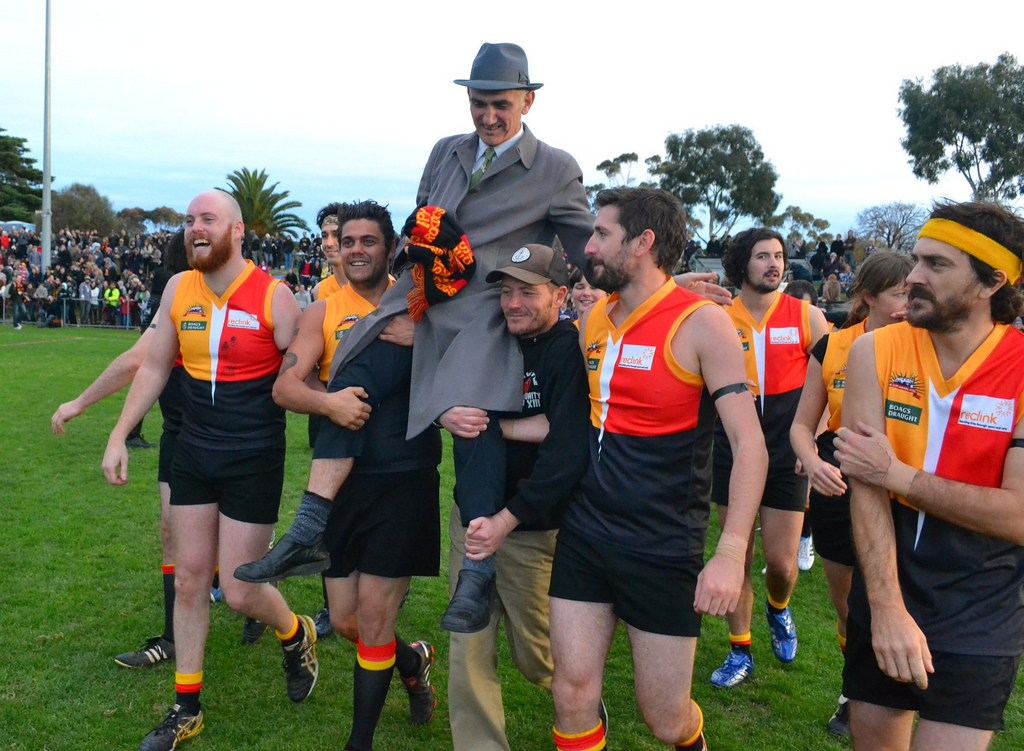
Singer-songwriter Paul Kelly, coach of the Espy Rockdogs, celebrates with his team after winning the Community Cup, an annual charity football match pitting musicians against radio personalities

Singer-songwriter Paul Kelly's 1987 single "Leaps and Bounds" is about the excitement of walking to the MCG for a game at the start of the football season. In reviewing the song for the book 1001 Songs, critic Toby Creswell listed "Melbourne, football, transcendence and memory" among the "grand themes" of Kelly's ouvre. Kelly played the song at the 2012 AFL Grand Final.

"The Swans Return" (1987) by folk rock band Weddings Parties Anything (WPA) expresses a South Melbourne fan's grief at the club's move to Sydney. "Under the Clocks" from Roaring Days (1988) chronicles a teenager's jaunt in Melbourne. He sees a boy in a Collingwood guernsey who "hums a tune I've learnt to hate so well", and asks a girl "Is there anywhere you'd rather be than with me at the MCG? / And if the Saints get done again, by Christ, I couldn't care." "Tough Time (In the Old Town Tonight)", released on No Show Without Punch (1990), is about spousal abuse after a Collingwood loss. WPA's 1992 single "Monday's Experts" describes the "post-mortem debates" following weekend football. It was used as the theme song for Talking Footy.

WPA frontman Mick Thomas recorded "Tom Wills" in 2001, casting Wills as a tragic genius: "He flew so high, up and over everyone / He almost caught the sun." The Holy Sea's Henry F. Skerritt assumes the role of Wills in "The Ten Rules" (2010). In "Tom Wills Would" (2003), Warumpi Band founder Neil Murray defines Wills as a man of team spirit who won't bootlick to authority. His 1996 song "Melbourne Town" opens with fans leaving a football ground, beaten "once again" under grey skies: "Win or lose, I'll have rain on my shoes." Murray collaborator David Bridie released "Jimmy Stynes" on his band My Friend the Chocolate Cake's 1994 LP Brood as a tribute to Jim Stynes, trailblazer of the "Irish experiment".

In 1993, Indigenous singer-songwriter Archie Roach penned "Colour of Your Jumper" after witnessing Nicky Winmar famously raise his guernsey in response to racial taunts at Victoria Park. Roach performed the song at the 2013 Dreamtime at the 'G.

Hailing from Finley in the Riverina, punk band Spiderbait captured country football in both "Footy" and the music video for "Ol' Man Sam", released on their 1992 debut album Shashavaglava. "When You Win the Brownlow" is a bonus track on their 1999 LP Grand Slam. Indie pop band The Lucksmiths often referenced football: "Under the Rotunda" (1997) follows a dating couple at a football ground; "Goodness Gracious" (2001) contrasts the defeat of one's football team with unrequited love; and "First Cousin" (2001) is about a footballer whose fearlessness—while helpful on the field—leads to personal problems, including drug abuse. On You Am I's 2001 song "Weeds", vocalist Tim Rogers uses football terms: "You sure wish you knew who was on the half-back flank / Twenty years when you took those flags on back to back." Rogers composed and voiced the AFL's This is Greatness campaign. In 2003, The Drugs released the football-themed single "Was Sport Better in the 70's?". In 2011, Eskimo Joe proposed a new Fremantle club song with "Freo Freo". Pond released a cover of "Freo Way to Go" in 2013.

Football songs have been written and performed for The Marngrook Footy Show, including "Jesaulenko, You Beauty" by Tex Perkins, "Tom Wills" by Shane Howard, and "It's Round 9, and We're Already Tanking" by Dave Larkin.

== Visual arts ==
What I saw of it struck me as the fastest game I have ever seen. ... The science of the Victorian game of football may be too quick for a stranger to grasp at first sight, or an artist to depict with justice.

— Harry Furniss, Irish illustrator, 1888

As early as the 1860s, engravings and illustrations of Australian football matches appeared in local newspapers and picturesque atlases including the Australasian Sketcher, the Australian Pictorial Weekly, and the Illustrated Australian News. Australian artists have continued to explore many aspects of football, from the game's speed, energy and dynamism, to its role as a binding force for various communities.

=== Cartoons ===
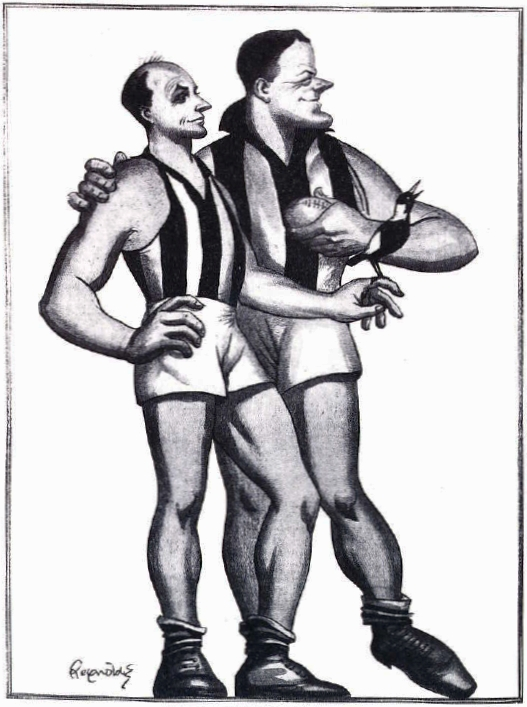
Len Reynolds' caricature of The Coventrys of Collingwood: Syd and Gordon Coventry, ca. 1930

Early exponents of football cartooning include Hugh McCrae ("Splash"), Dick Ovenden, and Ambrose Dyson, who was hired in 1907 as The Herald's first football cartoonist. Hal Gye took over from Dyson in 1911. Frank Koch contributed cartoons to the South Australian Football Budget, first issued in 1914.

WEG premiership posters adorn the walls of football fans around Australia.

Sam Wells published daily football cartoons in The Herald and The Age. During the 1923 VFL season, he suggested in one of his drawings that a black cat would help Geelong's chances against Carlton in Round 9. Geelong scored an upset win, prompting full-forward and artist Lloyd Hagger to design a cat mascot, and the club to adopt the "Cats" nickname. He was succeeded at The Herald by Mick Armstrong, who, like Alex Gurney and Len Reynolds, hailed from Tasmania. Activist and social realist artist Noel Counihan caricatured footballers for the press, and illustrated The Barracker's Bible (1983). In 1951, Lionel Coventry caricatured SANFL stars for a set of football cards. South Adelaide rover Len Lapthorne was incensed at his depiction and tried to sue.

William Ellis Green ("WEG"), another cartoonist for The Herald, instigated a VFL/AFL Grand Final tradition in 1954 after drawing a full-page caricature of Footscray, the League premiers. Green created posters for each premiership side from 1897 onwards to satisfy collectors, and some of his posters are valued in the tens of thousands of dollars range. Mark Knight took on the job after Green's death in 2008. George Haddon illustrated The Footy Fan's Handbook (1981), and drew caricatures for the Football Record. From 1994 to 2004, Andrew Fyfe satirised football events in weekly cartoons for The Footy Show.

=== Painting ===
==== Modern ====
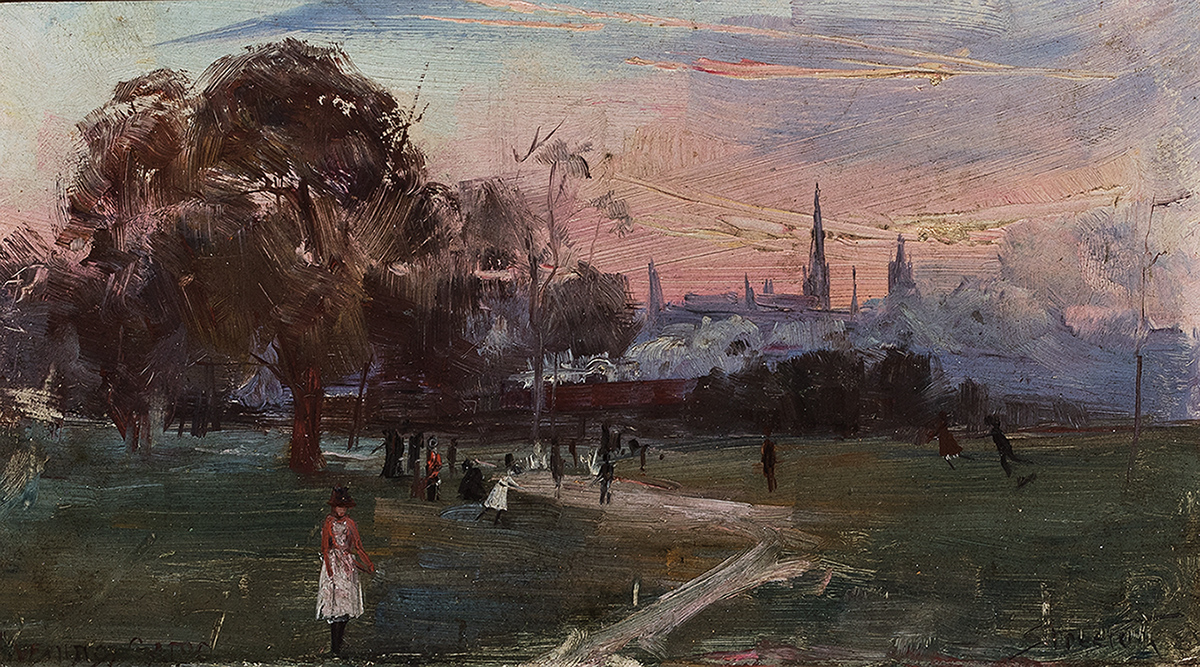
Arthur Streeton's 1889 impression Evening game depicts Richmond Paddock—the birthplace of Australian football—dotted with footballers.

Heidelberg School artist Arthur Streeton painted plein air "impressions" of football matches for the 9 by 5 Impression Exhibition of 1889. Football remained uncommon in Australian art until the 1930s, when Dorrit Black, Ethel Spowers, students of George Bell, and other modernists engaged with the sport as an exercise in form and design. Russell Drysdale, also a student of Bell, painted A Football Game in 1943 after visiting the drought-stricken Riverina. It shows a mother watching her children play football in a barren landscape.

Sidney Nolan deemed football "superior to all other methods of pushing a ball around, and ultimately it will conquer the face of the globe". On the creative process, he likened overcoming mental blocks to a player "deciding how to pass the ball for the best tactical advantage—how to continue with the painting". Footballer (1946), Nolan's only painting of a sportsperson, portrays St Kilda's Bill Mohr standing before a crowd. It has been read as a "veiled self-portrait", akin to his Ned Kelly series, which also references football in the form of an armoured Kelly's guernsey-like stripes in The Chase (1946).

I have painted aspects of the game and will no doubt paint more, as football is a reflection of modern values and violence.

— Noel Counihan

Nolan's Melbourne peers, Noel Counihan and Albert Tucker, captured the spectacle of leaping footballers. Counihan was a lifelong Swans fan; the team colours, red and white, figure in his series of football paintings, starting in 1947 with The High Mark. That same year, Fred Williams illustrated Collingwood footballers such as back pocket Charlie Utting. John Brack's Three of the Players (1953) depicts stereotyped characters from Collingwood's 1953 premiership side. Curator Chris McAuliffe identified the painting as the first to question myths surrounding football, presaging the approach of many contemporary artists.

Known for his semi-abstract paintings of the outback, Western Australian artist Robert Juniper melded football and landscape in Footie, Mount Magnet (1965), suggesting a "union of man and earth that resonates throughout Australian mythology". The work shows two footballers awash in a haze of red dust.

==== Contemporary ====
Wul gori-y-mar (Football for all Aboriginal People), painted by Arnhem Land artist Ginger Riley in 1996, shows naked figures playing football during wet season in Limmen Bight. The game is played within a series of concentric circles, designating sacred space.

Many Indigenous Australian artists have explored football and the role it plays in the social and cultural fabric of their communities. Arnhem Land painter Ginger Riley completed three works on football in 1996; each work features elements of Aboriginal mythology, such as Ngak Ngak, an eagle spirit who guards the space of play. In Football, the Wet Limmen Bight Country, ancestor spirits travel by boat to a game. Wul gori-y-mar (Football for all Aboriginal People) shows a game played with termite mounds for goalposts while ancestors watch from shelters in the land. It was acquired by the AFL. Munanga (White Fella Way) AFL Football depicts a game at the MCG.

Indigenous artist Ian Abdulla painted numerous football paintings.

In 2008, Australian painter and former Fitzroy footballer Jamie Cooper was commissioned by the AFL to capture the history of Australian rules. His painting titled The Game That Made Australia was unveiled on the 150th anniversary of the origins of Australian rules football, and is on display in the foyer of AFL House at Docklands Stadium.

=== Sculpture ===
Statues and other public artworks relating to football have been erected across Australia. Of the 10 bronze statues in the MCG's Parade of Champions, four are footballers: Ron Barassi, Dick Reynolds, Leigh Matthews and Haydn Bunton, Sr. Also located at the MCG is a statue commemorating the 1858 "foot-ball" match between Melbourne Grammar and Scotch College, which took place in nearby parklands. It depicts Tom Wills umpiring behind two players contesting the ball. In 2010, statues of Sydney Swans figures Paul Roos and Paul Kelly were unveiled at the SCG as part of the Basil Sellers Sports Sculptures Project.

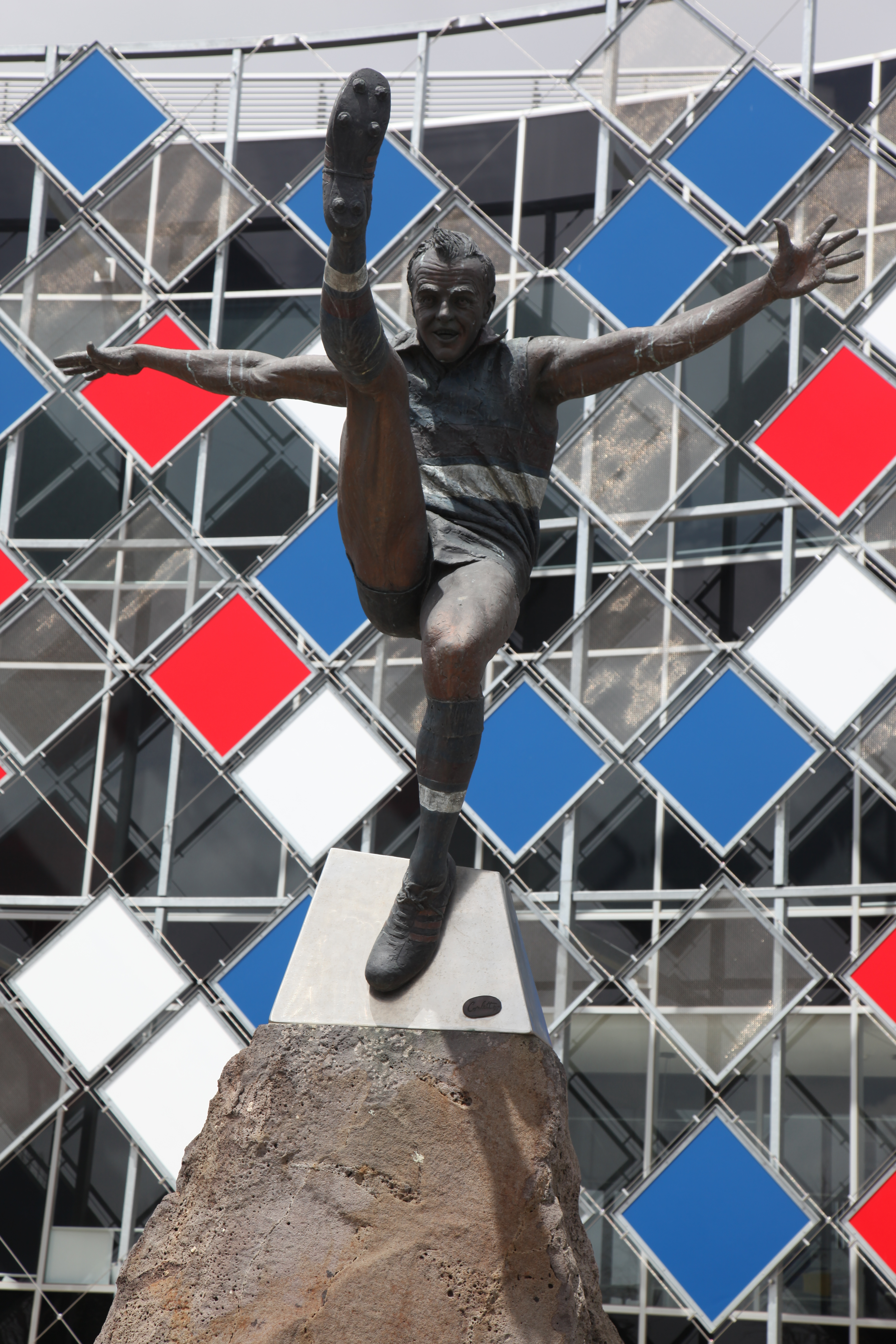
Statue of Ted Whitten outside Whitten Oval, Melbourne

In 1995, a statue of Ted Whitten was erected outside Whitten Oval. Located at Punt Road Oval is a 3-metre bronze statue of Jack Dyer. It is modelled after an iconic photograph of Dyer taken during the 1944 Preliminary Final in which Richmond defeated Essendon, primarily due to Dyer's VFL finals record of nine goals. A statue of Collingwood legend Bob Rose stands outside the Melbourne Sports and Entertainment Centre.

Famous spectacular marks have been immortalised in heroic sculpture. A statue by Robert Hitchcock of South Fremantle's John Gerovich taking a specky in the 1956 WANFL Preliminary Final stands outside Fremantle Oval in Fremantle, Western Australia, and a bronze statue of Essendon great John Coleman's 1953 specky against Fitzroy at Windy Hill was unveiled in Coleman's hometown of Hastings, Victoria.

Football has been depicted in reliefs and other sculptural works on Australian buildings. A ceramic frieze of a football match adorns the 1930s art deco brick pavilion in Fawkner Park, South Yarra. Football is also rendered in art deco style on a decorative panel inside the foyer of Melbourne's Manchester Unity Building, designed by Marcus Barlow and built in 1932. In 1967, two double-sided reliefs by sculptor John Dowie were mounted at Adelaide Oval. The panels commemorate South Australian footballer Vic Richardson, and show players from different spectator viewpoints.

In the mid-1990s, artist Jan Mitchell was commissioned by the City of Geelong to create the Baywalk Bollards, a series of painted pylons salvaged from the Yarra Street Pier, reflecting on the port city's history and local identities. Among the 104 bollards is a 19th-century Geelong footballer.

In 2007, Anmatyerre artists Josie Kunoth Petyarre and Dinni Kunoth Kemarre exhibited sixteen carved wooded sculptures of AFL footballers (one for each club) at AFL World in Melbourne. Artists of the Tiwi Islands have also created football carvings. Romolo Tipiloura's 2006 sculpture of Taparra (Moon Man) taking a mark as "Footy Man" pays homage to Tiwi ancestral beliefs and football as a quasi-sacred sport. The work entered the Charles Darwin University Art Collection, and was pre-selected for the 2007 National Aboriginal & Torres Strait Islander Art Award.

=== Photography ===
Photographer Grant Hobson has explored themes of Australian mateship and masculinity through amateur football. Footballer 21 (1988), part of Hobson's Transcending Toughness series, was included in the major touring exhibition Federation: Australian Art and Society 1901–2001. Several established photographers have produced photographic essays on grassroots football culture in remote communities. Throughout the early 2000s, Melbourne documentary photographer Jesse Marlow attended Indigenous football carnivals in Northern and Central Australia. His pictures were published by Hardie Grant in the 2003 book Centre Bounce: Football from Australia's Heart with written contributions by footballer Michael Long, Martin Flanagan and Neil Murray. The integral role football plays in Tiwi culture was the subject of Peter Eve and Monica Napper's 2011 travelling exhibition Yiloga! Tiwi Footy, chronicling the Tiwi Islanders' "day of the year": the Tiwi Islands Football League Grand Final. Others, such as Paul Dunn and social documentarian Rennie Ellis, have focused on the culture of football spectatorship and its associated paraphernalia. Both photographers were included in the 2010 group exhibition Australian Rules: Around the Grounds. The 300-page coffee table book Our Great Game: The Photographic History of Australian Football was published in 2010.

=== Exhibitions ===
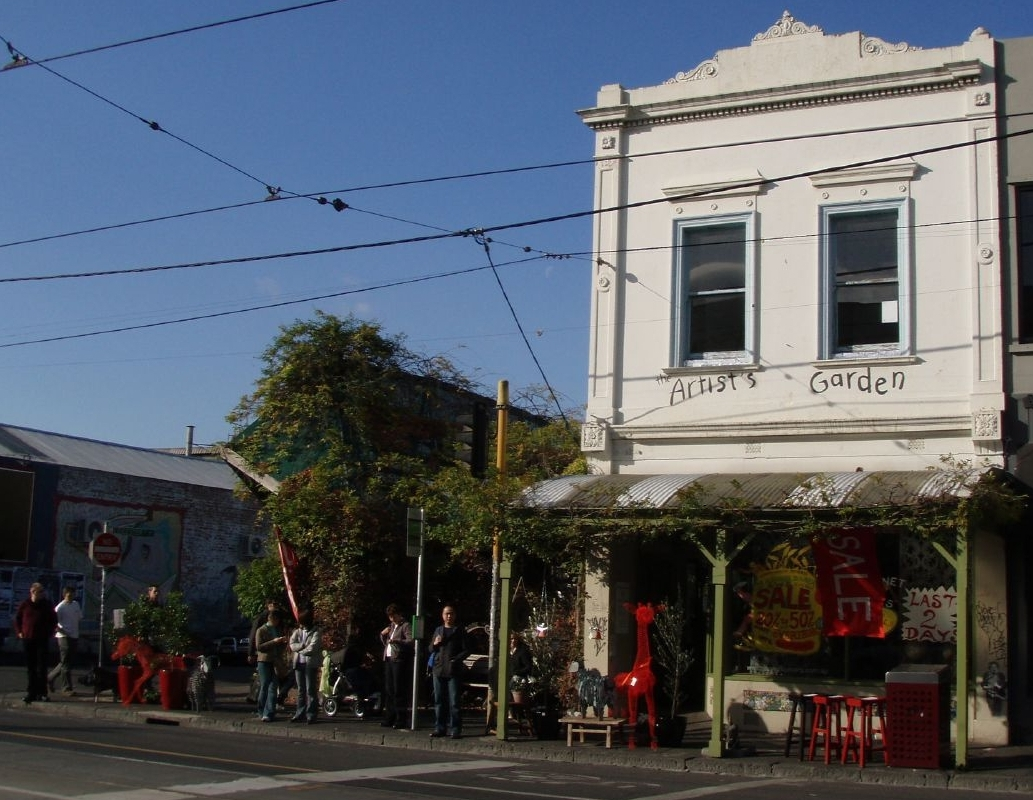
The Artist's Garden on Brunswick Street, home of the annual Footy Art Show

Beginning in 1991, the grassroots Footy Art Show is held annually at The Artist's Garden in Fitzroy, Melbourne. Each year has a new theme (e.g. 'Bring Back the Biffo' in 2001), encouraging "more subversive accounts of the players, the supporters and the strange worlds surrounding the game". Lewis Miller is among the show's regular contributors, and past judges include football identities Kevin Sheedy, Denis Pagan and Chris Connolly. In 2004, the National Gallery of Victoria hosted a football-themed prize exhibition of 21 artists. David Wadelton's painting Show Them You Want It was announced the $40,000 winner on The Footy Show. The work, inspired by Scanlens football cards, is based on a photograph of Luke McPharlin and Nick Riewoldt looking skyward at a football.

The $100,000 Basil Sellers Art Prize is held biennially at the Ian Potter Museum of Art. Its supporter, philanthropist Basil Sellers, founded the prize in an attempt to "bridge the gap between sport and art". The colourful spectacle of a major football match was the subject of Ivan Durrant's 2007 Boundary Rider series, nominated in the inaugural 2008 Basil Sellers Art Prize. Painted in a bold, semi-abstract style, the works are meant to invoke the passion and emotion of football barrackers. Melbourne artist Jon Campbell won the 2012 Basil Sellers Art Prize for his work Dream Team, a composite of 22 individual paintings, each depicting a famous football nickname, among them Buddy, God, Captain Blood and Flying Doormat.

== Film ==
=== Documentaries ===
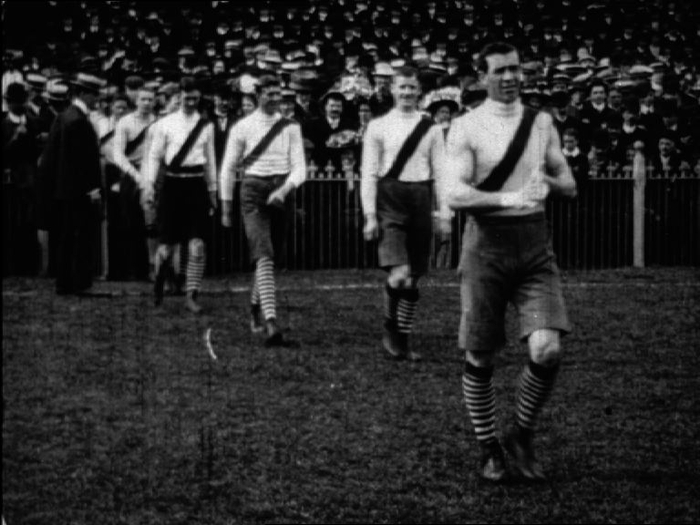
Still image taken from Cosens Spencer's film of the 1909 VFL Grand Final. South Melbourne players enter the field before the game.

Australian football was filmed as early as August 1898, when Essendon played Geelong at the East Melbourne Cricket Ground. The earliest known surviving footage of an Australian football match is Spencer's Pictures' film of the 1909 VFL Grand Final in which South Melbourne won their first flag against reigning premiers Carlton. In 2009, the National Film and Sound Archive celebrated the film's centenary by screening it daily over two weeks at Melbourne's Federation Square. Spencer also produced Marvellous Melbourne in 1910, the oldest surviving complete documentary on Melbourne. It features a VFL match between Collingwood and Fitzroy at Victoria Park. Another early surviving film shows the 1911 Tasmanian State Premiership match between North Launceston and decisive winners Cananore.

Megan Spencer's independent documentary Heathens (1991) studies the songs, chants and colourful profanity of a select group of St Kilda fans at Moorabbin Oval. In 1997, a behind-the-scenes documentary about the struggling Western Bulldogs titled Year of the Dogs was screened in Australian cinemas, and released on DVD in 2006. Included in the DVD's bonus material is the 1980 short documentary War Without Weapons, featuring Ron Barassi's motivational speeches and training sessions with North Melbourne throughout the 1979 VFL season.

The 2007 documentary Aboriginal Rules follows the Indigenous Yuendumu Magpies Football Club over the course of a year in preparation for the Central Australian Football League.

The Final Quarter is a 2019 Australian documentary, directed by Ian Darling, about the final stages of the career of Aboriginal AFL player Adam Goodes, during which he was the target of repeated booing by opposition fans. The film uses only archival footage and newspaper headlines from the last few years of Goodes' career.

Goodes' treatment was also the main subject of the 2019 documentary The Australian Dream, focusing on his experiences with racism and hate as an Aboriginal man, and its prevalence within modern Australia as well as the part it played in history. Written and narrated by journalist Stan Grant, the film goes deeper into broader aspects of racism in society. It opened the Melbourne International Film Festival and won the Audience Award for Best Documentary Feature.

=== Fictional film ===
Peter Weir's 1981 World War I epic Gallipoli features a football game (based on real events) between Victorian and Western Australian diggers near the Great Sphinx of Giza in Egypt. Frank Dunne (Mel Gibson) captains the Western Australians, and Gallipoli screenwriter David Williamson stars in a cameo role as the Victorian side's imposing ruckman.

In the Tim Burstall-directed ocker comedy Stork (1971), based on Williamson's 1970 play The Coming of Stork, Stork (Bruce Spence) and his flatmates reenact the 1970 VFL Grand Final in their kitchen with a ball of socks. Williamson and Burstall re-teamed for the 1974 film Petersen, starring Jack Thompson as a VFL player. Thompson played coach Laurie Holden alongside John Howard (Tasmanian recruit Geoff Hayward), Graham Kennedy (club president Ted Parker) and Frank Wilson (committeeman Jock Riley) in the 1980 film adaptation of Williamson's football play The Club. Directed by Bruce Beresford, The Club was nominated for five AFI Awards, including Best Film.

The Great Macarthy (1975) is an adaptation of Barry Oakley's novel A Salute to the Great Macarthy. John Jarratt makes his screen debut as MacArthy, a country footballer who is kidnapped by South Melbourne talent scouts under the orders of tyrannical club president Colonel Ball-Miller, played by Barry Humphries. Cameo appearances are made by footballers Jack Dyer and Lou Richards, and scenes from VFL games at Lake Oval are interspersed throughout.

Indigenous actor David Ngoombujarra won an AFI Award for his role as the gifted but feckless footballer "Pretty Boy" Floyd in the 1993 film Blackfellas, shot and set in Western Australia. The arthouse films Yolngu Boy (2001) and Australian Rules (2002, inspired by Phillip Gwynne's 1998 novel Deadly Unna?) explore the connection between Indigenous youth and Australian football.

The African Australian refugee experience in football is explored in Falling for Sahara (2011), directed by Khoa Do and starring Essendon's Andrew Welsh. Also looking at refugees and based around Aussie Rules is 2018 comedy film The Merger. Football is a pivotal theme in the 2009 comedy-drama My Year Without Sex, which follows the lives of a suburban Melbourne family including the father's attempts to coach his 12-year-old son's football team. Released in 2013, Blinder is a drama film about a football star who attempts to rebuild his life following a sex scandal.

In The Dressmaker (2015), set in a small town in country Victoria, Liam Hemsworth plays Teddy Mcswiney, the local football hero.

To celebrate the 150th anniversary of the sport, the 2008 Melbourne International Film Festival dedicated an evening to Footy Shorts—short films about Australian rules and what it means to individuals and communities.

The 2009 American film Funny People featured St Kilda supporter Eric Bana in a scene where, as Saints supporter Clarke, he explained Australian rules football to George Simmons (Adam Sandler) and Ira Wright (Seth Rogen) while the 2008 semifinal between St Kilda and Collingwood was shown.

== Television ==
Australian rules has a long history with television which dates back to the first live broadcast of a match in 1957. Several popular Australian television shows have celebrated the sport, some of the more popular current ones include The Footy Show and Before The Game. The 2002 television show The Club, featuring amateur club the "Hammerheads" was one of the first reality television shows in the world in the sports genre. The game has made the occasional appearance on the Australian soap opera Neighbours, which is popular around the world. In 2008, several scenes from the opening credits show characters holding and playing with a Sherrin ball. The show features several characters having favourite AFL clubs, watching and playing footy. In 2008, an episode of City Homicide portrayed a fictional team called the "South City Kookas" with a green and white striped guernsey and based at the Melbourne Cricket Ground (based loosely around Collingwood) featuring former Neighbours star and suburban footballer Blair McDonough. The first hand-written rules of Australian football—originally known as "The rules of the Melbourne Football Club – May 1859"—are one of 10 National Heritage-listed items featured in the 2009 documentary series Australia's Heritage: National Treasures, hosted by The Chaser's Chris Taylor. In 2019, actor musician and comedian Tim Minchin featured the traditional "Showdown" between the Adelaide Crows and Port Adelaide – in his mini-series Upright. The event, followed at an outback South Australian pub, was integral to this road-trip story, showing how passionate South Australians are about their local teams and how they stop everything to watch this contest between these fierce historical rivals.

== Video games ==
Australian Rules is also featured in many video games.

== See also ==
- Australian rules football culture
