= Blessed Unrest (disambiguation) =

Blessed Unrest is a 2007 book by Paul Hawken.

Blessed Unrest may also refer to:

- Blessed Unrest (album), by The Holy Sea
- The Blessed Unrest, a 2013 album by Sara Bareilles
