= The Club (1980 film) =

- Theatrical poster
- Directed by: Bruce Beresford
- Written by: David Williamson
- Starring: Jack Thompson; John Howard; Graham Kennedy
- Music by: Mike Brady
- Production companies: South Australian Film Corporation; New South Wales Film Corporation
- Distributed by: Roadshow
- Release date: 18 September 1980
- Running time: 96 minutes
- Country: Australia
- Language: English
- Box office: A$899,000 (Australia)

The Club is a satirical film based on the play of the same name by the Australian playwright and dramatist David Williamson. It follows the fortunes of a football club over the course of a season, and explores the clashes of individuals from within the club. It was inspired by the backroom dealings and antics of the Victorian Football League's Collingwood Football Club.

The film was produced in 1980, written by Williamson and directed by Bruce Beresford. It stars John Howard, Jack Thompson, Graham Kennedy and Frank Wilson. The film was described as a "hilarious, sharply observed slice of life".

The film features Mike Brady's 1979 football anthem "Up There Cazaly".

== Plot ==
The club pays a high price for Tasmanian recruit, Geoff Hayward (Howard). Geoff does not play well initially, infuriating the dedicated coach, Laurie Holden (Thompson). With the club playing so badly, Laurie's coaching days may be over soon.

Club president Ted Parker (Kennedy) is forced to resign following an assault on a stripper. The incident could have been kept quiet but for backstabbing from various board members, especially Jock (Frank Wilson) and Gerry (Alan Cassell).

Laurie discovers that the board wants to sack him (arising from a long grudge held against Laurie by Jock), so Laurie inspires Geoff to start playing well. It is later revealed that Jock used to be Laurie's coach when Laurie played for the club. Jock was jealous because Laurie nearly surpassed his club record of 282 games. He also lost a Grand Final by making poor decisions under the influence of alcohol.

Laurie then told the members that Jock was drunk. After being dismissed as coach, he was replaced by Laurie and tried to sabotage the club his best to get back at him. The team start winning and eventually make the grand final, beating Fitzroy. The film ends with Gerry saying, 'Laurie's a great coach', then looking at Jock, 'God knows why some members of the board wanted to get rid of him'.

=== Differences from the play ===
The major differences between the play and the film versions include:

- In the film, there are some scenes that take place outside The Club's hallowed halls. In the play, all of the scenes are inside The Club and are acted out in real time, whereas the film takes place over a season.
- In the play, The Club is never named to be one specific club. In the film, Collingwood's guernsey is used, the entire film was shot on location at Collingwood's then home ground of Victoria Park, the Collingwood theme song is used as a motif, and Collingwood players such as Peter Daicos and Rene Kink, as well as coach Tom Hafey, are featured in speaking and non-speaking roles. Although only commentators refer to Collingwood by name, everyone else in the movie refers to it as 'the club'.
- In the film, the incident with the stripper is shown, whereas in the play, she is an unseen character.
- The play does not show the club winning the premiership, instead ending after Laurie vows to make the finals and dissolve the club's board.

== Characters ==
The plot revolves around six central characters:

- Geoff Hayward (John Howard) – a new recruit with a huge reputation lured to the club with big money in an attempt to haul the team up the ladder. Hayward resents that the club sees him as a commodity to be bought and sold.
- Laurie Holden (Jack Thompson) – the respected and earnest coach of the club whose champion playing career was ended by injury just short of the record number of games played for the club. Holden's credo is honesty and discipline, but the team has struggled to find success under his coaching and he knows that he is under pressure to avoid the sack. Holden is generally regarded as the second best coach in the league behind Hawthorn's "Rostoff", who was also the coach the club's board wish to replace him with.
- Ted Parker (Graham Kennedy) – club president and owner of a pie factory named "Parker's Pies". Parker is just a fan with a lot of money that the club want a share of. Although his knowledge of the game's intricacies is limited, he has watched virtually every game played by the club since he was a small boy. When Hayward demands an extra A$10,000 to join the club, Parker puts up the money himself.
- Jock Riley (Frank Wilson) – ex-champion player from an earlier era, the successful coaching predecessor to Laurie and now an influential committeeman. Jock has a finger on the pulse of everything that happens around the club and he regularly meddles when he thinks it necessary. He wants to get rid of Holden so that his most games coached record with the club remains unbeaten. The name Jock is a tribute to long serving Collingwood player and coach Jock McHale.
- Gerry Cooper (Alan Cassell) – a new breed administrator recently hired to drag the club into a more professional era. Gerry sees the club as a business, his appointment as merely a job and eschews emotion in his decision making. He is in it more for personal gain than for the benefit of the club.
- Danny Rowe (Harold Hopkins) – Player and captain of the team. His career is almost finished and the club consider trading him.

=== Minor characters ===
Prominent football commentators such as Fred Cook, Lou Richards, Jack Dyer, Bob Davis and reporters Scot Palmer and Ron Carter have parts in the film, as do Collingwood footballers at the time, Peter Daicos (as himself) and Rene Kink (as Tank O'Donohue). Collingwood's coach at the time, Tom Hafey, features as the assistant coach. Maggie Doyle plays Geoff Hayward's girlfriend.

== Setting ==
In the script, Williamson uses the arrival of Hayward at the club as a device that gets these characters interacting to express their opinions on Hayward's poor early-season form and attitude, thus exploring several themes relevant to the culture of any sporting club. The original play and the movie were created at a time when Australian football was in a state of flux, moving from a semi-professional state (where players were paid "beer" money for their services) to the modern, fully professional, franchised structure that is known today as the Australian Football League. This process began in the late 1970s/early 1980s.

== Box office ==
The Club grossed $890,000 (equivalent to $4,299,702 in 2022) at the box office in Australia.

Williamson rated the film as one of the best made from his work, saying it was "very well done".

It was the third screen collaboration between Jack Thompson and David Williamson and as of 2025 is the last to date despite the claim that "The combination of Thompson and Williamson was one of the most perfect actor-writer teaming in the history of Australian cinema."

== See also ==
- Cinema of Australia
- Australian rules football in Australian popular culture
- South Australian Film Corporation
