= Believe in Yourself =

Believe in Yourself may refer to:

== Music ==
- "Believe in Yourself" (1963 song), a song from the musical Half a Sixpence and used in its 2016 adaptation.
- "Believe in Yourself" (1972 song), a song by Joe Raposo made for Sesame Street and recorded many times.
- "Believe in Yourself" (1975 song), a ballad by Charlie Smalls from the musical The Wiz sung in several adaptations; including The Wiz Live! and the soundtrack to the 1978 film adaptation.
- "Believe in Yourself" (1980 song), a song by Jody Sims recorded by the R&B group Switch on the album This Is My Dream
- "Believe in Yourself" (1984 song), a song by the Australian new wave group Flash and the Pan recorded on the album Early Morning Wake Up Call
- "Believe in Yourself" (1985 song), a song by Greg Scelsa recorded by Greg & Steve on the album Kidding Around
- "Believe in Yourself" (1987 song), a song by Yukou Kusunoki recorded by Casiopea on their jazz fusion album Platinum
- "Believe in Yourself" (1991 song), a song by the alternative rock band the Godfathers recorded on their album Unreal World
- "Believe in Yourself" (1996 song), the theme song to the animated children's television series Arthur recorded by Ziggy Marley and the Melody Makers in 1996
- "Believe in Yourself" (1998 song), a song by Roger Taylor recorded on the album Electric Fire
- Believe in Yourself (1999 album), an album by Dennis Brown
- "Believe in Yourself" (1999 song), a song by the Swedish band Navigators
- "Believe in Yourself" (2003 song), a song by the American rock band Brad recorded on their album Best Friends?
- "Believe in Yourself" (2006 song), a song by Death Note
- "Believe in Yourself" (2007 song), a song by the Brazilian heavy metal band Shadowside
- "Believe in Yourself" (2009 song), a song by Nigerian singer Duncan Mighty recorded on the album Fully Loaded
- "Believe in Yourself" (2014 song), a song by Mao Abe used as the theme song for the anime television series Baby Steps
- "Believe in Yourself" (2019 song), a single by American indie pop and electropop artist Remmi
- "Believe in Yourself" (2024 song), a song by the Japanese band doa
- "Glaub an Dich" (English: "Believe in Yourself"), a song on the rap album Südberlin Maskulin by German rappers Fler and Godsilla
- "J Live Tour 2013 - Believe in Yourself" – tour by J

== Publications ==
- "Believe in Yourself", the third chapter of the manga series Demon Slayer: Kimetsu no Yaiba
- Believe in Yourself, a 1955 book by Joseph Murphy
- Believe in Yourself – Life Lessons from Swami Vivekananda, a 2020 book by Nanditha Krishna
- Believe In Yourself: Who'd Want To Be A Writer?, a 1996 book by Colin Thiele

== Other ==
- "Believe in Yourself", the motto of the Taiwanese video game developer Gamtec.
- "Believe in Yourself", a spiritual proclamation by the Open-source religion
- "Believe in Yourself", motto of the Kooralbyn International School
- "Believe in Yourself", the second episode of the first season of the animated television series Iwa-Kakeru! Climbing Girls
