= Footballer (Nolan) =

1946 painting by Sidney Nolan

- Artist: Sidney Nolan
- Year: 1946
- Type: enamel paint on composition board
- Dimensions: 121.9 cm × 91.4 cm (48.0 in × 36.0 in)
- Location: National Gallery of Victoria, Melbourne

Footballer is a 1946 painting by Australian artist Sidney Nolan. It depicts an Australian rules footballer standing before a crowd of spectators at a football match. For many years the painting was thought to be a generic image of a footballer, however Nolan later revealed that the painting is based on Bill Mohr, a star player for the St Kilda Football Club during the 1930s.

In 2002, the painting was acquired by the National Gallery of Victoria, and has become one of the gallery's most popular works. According to journalist Geoff McClure, Footballer "has special significance because, together with Drysdale's The Cricketers, it represents virtually the entire sports-related work ever done by our masters."

== Background ==
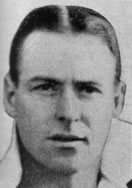
Footballer is based on St Kilda's Bill Mohr.

Born in the inner-Melbourne working class suburb of Carlton on 22 April 1917, Nolan grew up in bayside St Kilda, Melbourne's main leisure precinct. His childhood was spent playing in and around Luna Park, St Kilda Pier and along nearby beaches, jetties and sea baths; memories of this period played an inspirational role in the imagery of Nolan's early paintings, including the Bathers series which he started in 1942. Nolan also had many sporting interests growing up, in particular swimming, cycling, cricket and Australian rules football. He regularly went on weekend trips to the outer at the St Kilda Cricket Ground to barrack for his team, the St Kilda Football Club.

In the mid-1940s, when Nolan was painting boyhood recollections of St Kilda and "heroic" figures such as bushranger Ned Kelly, he decided to paint Footballer, an "emblematic portrait of the sports-warrior". The work was painted in the dining room at Heide, the Templestowe home of art patrons John and Sunday Reed, on 24 August 1946. In his journal, Nolan writes: "Finished my painting of a footballer this morning and called Jim [the gardener at Heide] to have a look at it. He said it looked quite real, almost as if you were there, so it at least passed the critical eye of a specialist." Its completion date falls in the middle of Nolan's iconic first series of 27 Ned Kelly works, all but one painted in the Heide dining room. Together with the Kelly series, Footballer has been interpreted as a "veiled self-portrait"—both men, like the artist, stand outside society in a "space no longer governed by everyday rules."

The painting was first exhibited at the Melbourne branch of the Contemporary Art Society in 1946, and later shown in retrospective exhibitions throughout the 1960s and 70s with the title Fullback, St Kilda, which led to speculation that the footballer is based on Test cricketer and St Kilda fullback Keith "Nugget" Miller, of whom Nolan was a great fan. Nolan later revealed in an interview that St Kilda's Bill Mohr is the subject, saying "I lived in St Kilda and I went to a lot of matches there and they had a fullback called Billy Mohr and in 1946, after coming out of the army and casting back for memories to paint, I decided to paint him."

== Composition ==
The footballer's red, white, yellow and black colours reference those adopted by the Saints during World War I. His black shorts "share a singularity and intensity akin to Ned Kelly's helmet", while the broad-striped guernsey—bold against the amorphous backdrop of spectators' faces and vertical lines of the goalpost and boundary fence—prefigures the horizontal bars of escaped convict David Bracefell in Nolan's Eliza Fraser series.

== National Gallery of Victoria purchase ==
The painting, valued in 2002 at approximately $500,000, was on the National Gallery of Victoria's wish list for many years. The gallery acquired the painting in 2002 from a private collector based in England, with costs met jointly by the State Government of Victoria and Foster's Group. It was officially gifted to the gallery by Premier Steve Bracks on Channel Nine's The Footy Show, becoming the first painting to go on display at the newly built Ian Potter Centre, home of the National Gallery of Victoria's Australian art collection.

== Legacy ==
Footballer is used as the cover image for Volume II of David Williamson's 1986 publication Collected Plays, which contains his 1977 football play The Club.

In 2011, the National Gallery of Victoria celebrated its 150th anniversary with a range of festivities including life-size renditions of the gallery's most loved works populated along St Kilda Road to the Ian Potter Centre. At Federation Square, high-flying circus performers played kick-to-kick as a tribute to Footballer, where a shearing display was also held in commemoration of Tom Roberts' 1890 painting Shearing the Rams.

Australia Post issued a stamp in 2017 featuring Nolan's Footballer.

== See also ==
- Australian rules football in Australian popular culture
