= The Real Seachange =

Australian reality television series

- Starring: John Howard
- Country of origin: Australia
- No. of episodes: 23

Production
- Executive producers: Steve Bibb, Dan Meenan, Brent Rees, Graham Ross
- Producers: Clare Mandile, Ariel White
- Running time: 30 mins (with commercials)

Original release
- Network: Channel Seven
- Release: 2006 – 2008

The Real Seachange is an Australian reality television series on the Seven Network, narrated by actor John Howard.

The series follows families, couples and singles who leave the big cities behind in search of a better life. This phenomenon is known as a seachange. The title also references Howard's former role on the popular drama series SeaChange.

The first season aired in late 2006 and consisted of 13 episodes. A second season aired in 2008 and had 10 episodes.

== See also ==
- List of Australian television series
