= Rex Sellers (cricketer) =

Australian cricketer (born 1940)

Personal information
- Full name: Reginald Hugh Durning Sellers
- Born: 20 August 1940 (age 86); Bulsar, Gujarat, British India
- Batting: Right-handed
- Bowling: Legbreak googly

International information
- National side: Australia
- Only Test (cap 230): 17 October 1964 v India

Career statistics
Competition	Test	First-class
Matches	1	53
Runs scored	0	1,089
Batting average	–	18.14
100s/50s	–	0/2
Top score	0	87
Balls bowled	30	9102
Wickets	0	121
Bowling average	–	38.45
5 wickets in innings	–	4
10 wickets in match	–	1
Best bowling	–	5/36
Catches/stumpings	1/–	41/–
- Source: Cricinfo, 19 November 2022

Reginald Hugh Durning Sellers OAM (born 20 August 1940) is a former Test cricketer (Australian test cap 230). He was the second Indian-born cricketer to have played a Test match for Australia and the first of Anglo-Indian descent.

== Family ==
The son of William Alfred Durning Sellers (1907–2005), and Irene Ethel Sellers (1915–2005), née Fremantle, Reginald Hugh Durning Sellers was born at Bulsar, now Valsad, in Gujarat, India on 20 August 1940.

Sellers is married to Ann and has three sons. His brother Basil Sellers is a businessman and philanthropist.

== Education ==
Having migrated with his family to Australia in early 1948, and from the connexion with Cecil Charles Shinkfield (1891–1973), then the headmaster of King's College, Adelaide, established aboard RMS Strathaird during their voyage to Australia the two brothers attended King's College.

== Cricket ==
A tall leg-spinner, and affectionately known as "Sahib" in cricket circles, he toured England with Bobby Simpson's touring team in the summer of 1964 but did not play any of the test matches. He played one Test match for Australia in India, in October 1964, in which he was bowled for a duck, took one catch and bowled five overs for 17 runs without taking a wicket.

His playing career was severely restricted when cysts developed under a tendon attached to his spinning finger; although he did return to the South Australian Cricket team as a batsman, where he made his highest score — 87, caught Ian Brayshaw, bowled Tony Lock — in his last innings, in the January 1967 match in Perth against Western Australia.

== Cricket administrator ==
He retired after the 1966–67 season. However Sellers has had a long career serving the South Australian Cricket Association (SACA) in both selection and administrative roles, was on the board of the Les Favell Foundation and was made a Life Member of the SACA. He was also a long serving president at the Woodville West Torrens Football Club in the SANFL.

== 2013 Australia Day Honours ==
He was awarded the Medal of the Order of Australia in the 2013 Australia Day Honours, for "service to the sport of cricket, particularly as an administrator."
