= A Beginner's Guide to the Sea =

Studio album by The Holy Sea
- Released: 2008
- Recorded: 2008

The Holy Sea chronology
Blessed Unrest (2000)	A Beginner's Guide to the Sea (2008)	Ghosts of the Horizon (2010)

A Beginner's Guide to the Sea is the second album from Melbourne-based band The Holy Sea.

The album was recorded at Atlantis Sound in Port Melbourne by David McCluney and was released in 2008.

The album featured the singles Paddy, There's Got to Be One More Bar Open and Ghost Town.

The album artwork was designed by Perth-based comic artist Edward J. Grug III.

== Track listing ==
All tracks are written by Henry F. Skerritt, except where noted

No.	Title	Length
1.	"Smile"	5:04
2.	"Ghost Town"	2:28
3.	"You Can’t Stand in the Way of Progress"	3:33
4.	"Ode for the Woman who Would be my Wife"	2:29
5.	"A Million Ways to Say #6/8"	5:30
6.	"Paddy, There’s Got to Be One More Bar Open"	4:00
7.	"September"	7:26
8.	"The Parting Glass" (Traditional, arr. The Holy Sea)	2:58

== Musicians ==
- Henry F. Skerritt – Vocals, Guitar, Harmonica
- Daniel Hoey – Piano, Rhodes, Organ, Harmonium
- Victor Utting – Guitar, Percussion
- F. David Bower – Drums, Percussion
- Andrew Fuller – Bass
- Emma Frichot – Backing Vocals
- Gareth Skinner – Cello
- Garrett Costigan – Pedal Steel
