= Backyard Ashes =

- Film poster
- Directed by: Mark Grentell
- Written by: Peter Cox
- Produced by: Anne Robinson
- Starring: Andrew Gilbert; Felix Williamson
- Distributed by: Umbrella Entertainment
- Release date: 17 November 2013
- Country: Australia
- Language: English
- Budget: $600,000

Backyard Ashes is a 2013 Australian comedy film about backyard cricket.

== Cast ==
- Andrew S. Gilbert as Dougie Waters
- Felix Williamson as Edward Lords
- Rebecca Massey as Lilly Waters
- Damian Callinan as Spock
- John Wood as Merv
- Waseem Khan as Bin
- Shingo Usami as Taka
- Jamie Way as Shep
- Stephen Holt as Norm
- Norah George as Grace
- Lex Marinos as Mac
- Maddison Smith-Catlin as Kerri
- Jake Speer as Pigeon
- Zenia Starr as Nehru
- Michael Morley as Young Cricket Supporter

== Production ==
Backyard Ashes was shot in the town of Wagga Wagga, New South Wales, the first of two films to be shot in the town (the other being Stakes).

== Reception ==
Film critic Paul Byrnes wrote in The Sydney Morning Herald: "Grentell has good timing and an inventive, unpredictable eye for a gag. He has a feel for the dryness of Australian humour, without the jingoism." The film earned a profit and grossed over $100,000 in just four cinemas in its first month. It went on to screen on more than 70 screens nationally, grossing over $600,000, and continues to pay small royalties.
