= Damian Callinan =

Australian comedian

- Occupation: Comedian
- Website: damiancallinan.com.au

Damian Callinan is an actor/comedian from Melbourne, Australia.

== Entertainment career ==
Callinan has performed in many mediums, including TV, film, radio and live stand-up. He acted in the Australian sketch comedy television series skitHOUSE and made regular appearances on Before the Game. He has been a member of the cast of The Newsreader.

In 2006, Callinan presented a live comedy show as part of the Melbourne Comedy Festival about his fertility problems entitled Damian Callinan has Spaznuts. That year he also debuted Babysitting, casting himself as a babysitter caring for a giant baby. In his show Sportsman's Night, Callinan, with no props, performed every role in a story about a football club gathering. He's also performed several other solo comedy shows: Damian Callinan Calls "Last Drinks", Eureka Stocktake, The Cave to the Rave: The Story of Dance and Speech Night.

In 2007, he appeared in a stage show called The Complete Works of William Shakespeare Abridged alongside Frank Woodley and Keith Adams.

In 2008, he played Pete Minotti in the City Homicide's "Somersaulting Dogs".

Callinan appeared in the 2013 film Backyard Ashes.

Callinan's show The Merger was commissioned by Regional Arts Victoria and Vic Health to deal with issues of racism in regional communities. Callinan began performing the show in 2010. The show tells the story of a struggling country football club that recruits newly arrived refugees to fill its playing roster.

In March 2015, Callinan took his show The Lost WWI Diary to the Adelaide Fringe Festival. The show, a black humour comedy based on a diary discovered in a Warrnambool op-shop, featured characterisations of ANZAC soldiers at the time of the Gallipoli Campaign. News Corp Australia reviewer Nick Richardson was impressed by the show's realism.

Callinan launched his twelfth solo show, Swing Man at the Melbourne International Comedy Festival in 2016.

In 2017, the one-man stage show titled The Merger received funding from Screen NSW, and Backyard Ashes director Mark Grentell reteamed with Callinan to helm the film version (also called The Merger), which was released nationally around Australia in 2018 and was later available on Netflix.

== Filmography ==
- skitHOUSE
- Comedy Slapdown
- Before The Game
- The Wedge
- Rove Live
- Melbourne Comedy Festival Gala
- Joker Poker
- Good Morning Australia
- The Fat
- Off Road
- Backyard Ashes
- The Merger
- City Homicide (2008)
- The Newsreader
