= Basil Sellers Art Prize =

Art exhibition and award

The Basil Sellers Art Prize is a long-term project, with biennial awards. For many years the exhibition tours were a collaboration of the Ian Potter Museum of Art, the University of Melbourne, and NETS Victoria (National Exhibition Touring Support Victoria). There awards were originally created to help change Australian's perception and enjoyment of art and sport, but as of 2025, the prize does not include a sporting theme and is open to artists from across Australia.

== History ==
The Basil Sellers Art Prize encouraged a dynamic and critical reflection on all forms of sport and sporting culture in Australia.

Sport has been a recurring theme in Australian art. For contemporary artists today, sport touches upon anything from everyday life through to globalisation, from the concrete experience of a game through to abstract notions like cheating and fair play. Sport is about winners and losers, individuals and teams, rules and penalties, equipment and architecture, fans and souvenirs, triumphs and scandals.

The Basil Sellers Art Prize was supported by Basil Sellers AM and aimed to encourage contemporary artists to develop their practice, to engage with the many themes within sport past and present, and to contribute to critical reflection on all forms of sport and sporting culture in Australia.

From 2008 to 2016, the biennial award and exhibition of finalists ran out of the Ian Potter Museum of Art, presenting sculpture, painting, photography and drawing by contemporary Australian artists offering $100,000 for a single outstanding work of art.

In 2018, two additional prizes, sponsored by Eurobodalla Shire Council, were added to the awards. The Eurobodalla Prize ($5,000) and a people's choice award ($500).

In 2019, a purpose-built exhibition space, The Basil Sellers Exhibition Centre, nicknamed 'The Bas', was built in Moruya, New South Wales and now houses the exhibition works.

As of 2025, there is a prize pool of over A$30,000 for winning artists, with an additional A$25,000 acquisitive award. The prize no longer requires artists to submit work with a sporting theme.

== Selected winners ==
- 2022 - Michael Thomson, An Encounter on the Path that Leads to the River
- 2020 - Peter Matthew Yates, Connection
- 2018 - Anh Nguyen, Jamboree Mornings
- 2016 - Merryn Sommerville, Ghosts I’ve met
- 2014 - Susan Chancellor, The family lounge
- 2012 - Frances Luke, Mossy Point Headland 1
- 2010 - Stan Squires, Pambula river mouth
- 2008 - Kerry Johns, Lilli Pilli
- 2006 - Jennifer Hawkins, …and on that day they shall rise up…
- 2004 - Sue Christie, Life chaos and everything

== 2018 exhibition touring schedule ==
"Play on: The art of sport / 10 years of the Basil Sellers Art Prize"

- Hazelhurst Regional Gallery and Arts Centre, NSW

9 Dec 2017 – 11 Feb 2018

- Mornington Peninsula Regional Gallery, VIC

2 Mar – 29 Apr 2018

- Devonport Regional Gallery, TAS

7 Jul – 19 Aug 2018

- UQ Art Museum, QLD

24 Nov 2018 – 3 Feb 2019

- Bunbury Regional Art Galleries, WA

8 Mar – 5 May 2019

- Riddoch Art Gallery, SA

24 May – 2 Aug 2019

- Western Plains Cultural Centre, NSW

31 Aug – 3 Nov 2019

== See also ==
- Basil Sellers
