= The Club (play) =

Play by David Williamson

- Original language: English
- Written by: David Williamson
- Subject: Australian rules football

Premiere
- Date: 24 May 1977
- Place: Russell Street Theatre

The Club is a satirical play by the Australian playwright David Williamson. It follows the fortunes of an Australian rules football club over the course of a season, and explores the clashes of individuals from within the club. It was inspired by the backroom dealings and antics of the Victorian Football League's Collingwood Football Club.

The play was first staged by the Melbourne Theatre Company on 24 May 1977 at the Russell Street Theatre. It toured Australia-wide, breaking all previous box office records, and had seasons in Germany, the United States (where it ran under the name Players) and the United Kingdom. It is popular with amateur theatre groups and secondary school students, having been in the senior English syllabi for four Australian states for many years.

In 2007, The Club was re-produced and toured throughout Australia, starring John Wood.

== Plot ==
The club pays a high price for Tasmanian recruit, Geoff Hayward. Geoff does not play well initially, infuriating the dedicated coach, Laurie Holden (Thompson). With the club playing so badly, Laurie's coaching days look to be over soon.

Club president Ted Parker is forced to resign following an assault on a stripper. The incident could have been kept quiet but for backstabbing from various board members, especially Jock and Gerry.

Laurie discovers that the board wants to sack him (arising from a long grudge held against Laurie by Jock), so Laurie inspires Geoff to start playing well. It is later revealed that Jock used to be Laurie's coach when Laurie played for the club. Jock was jealous because Laurie nearly surpassed his club record of 282 games. He also lost a Grand Final by making poor decisions under the influence of alcohol. Laurie told the members that Jock was drunk. After being dismissed as coach, Jock was replaced by Laurie and tried to sabotage the club to exact his revenge. Laurie vows to make the Grand Final.

== Characters ==
The plot revolves around six central characters:

Geoff Hayward – a new recruit with a huge reputation lured to the club with big money in an attempt to haul the team up the ladder. Hayward resents that the club sees him as a commodity to be bought and sold.

Laurie Holden – the respected and earnest coach of the club whose champion playing career was ended by injury just short of the record number of games played for the club. Holden's credo is honesty and discipline, but the team has struggled to find success under his coaching and he knows that he is under pressure to avoid the sack. Holden is generally regarded as the second best coach in the league behind Hawthorn's "Rostoff", who was also the coach the club's board wish to replace him with.

Ted Parker – club president and owner of a pie factory named "Parker's Pies". Parker is just a fan with a lot of money that the club want a share of. Although his knowledge of the game's intricacies is limited, he has watched virtually every game played by the club since he was a small boy. When Hayward demands an extra AU$10,000 to join the club, Parker puts up the money himself.

Jock Riley – ex-champion player from an earlier era, the successful coaching predecessor to Laurie and now an influential committeeman. Jock has a finger on the pulse of everything that happens around the club and he regularly meddles when he thinks it necessary. He wants to get rid of Holden so that his most games coached record with the club remains unbeaten. The name Jock is a tribute to long serving Collingwood player and coach Jock McHale.

Gerry Cooper – a new breed administrator recently hired to drag the club into a more professional era. Gerry sees the club as a business, his appointment as merely a job and eschews emotion in his decision making. He is in it more for personal gain than for the benefit of the club.

Danny Rowe – Player and captain of the team. His career is almost finished and the club consider trading him.

== Background ==
In 1968 Williamson wrote an anti Vietnam War play "Good Old Collingwood Forever".

Williamson later said:

I think the coach, Laurie, was by and large a centre of decency and morality in that play, except it had him tempted at one moment when he was told if he swapped the player he was most loyal to for another player he could get another player, and he momentarily said, 'Well, can I?' And then he was told he couldn't...I mean, he was set up for it, but it showed that even he was capable of temptation. But Jock was certainly the bad thug of the pieces, although he wasn't really the worst character, he was a buffoon. The worst character was the administrator who was totally sociopathic and would do anything to further his own career.

== Production history ==
The play had a successful run in England in 1980.

== Film adaptation ==
A film version was produced in 1980, written by David Williamson, directed by Bruce Beresford and starring John Howard, Jack Thompson, Graham Kennedy and Frank Wilson. The film was described as a "hilarious, sharply observed slice of life". The film features Mike Brady's 1978 football anthem "Up There Cazaly". The Club grossed $899,000 at the box office in Australia, which is equivalent to $3,822,465 in 2017.

== See also ==
- Australian rules football in Australian popular culture
