= Mythology of Australia =

Australian mythology stems largely from Europeans who colonised the country from 1788, subsequent domestic innovation, as well as other immigrant and Indigenous Australian traditions, many of which relate to Dreamtime stories. Australian mythology survives through a combination of word of mouth, historical accounts and the continued practice and belief in Dreamtime within Aboriginal communities.

== Dreamtime ==
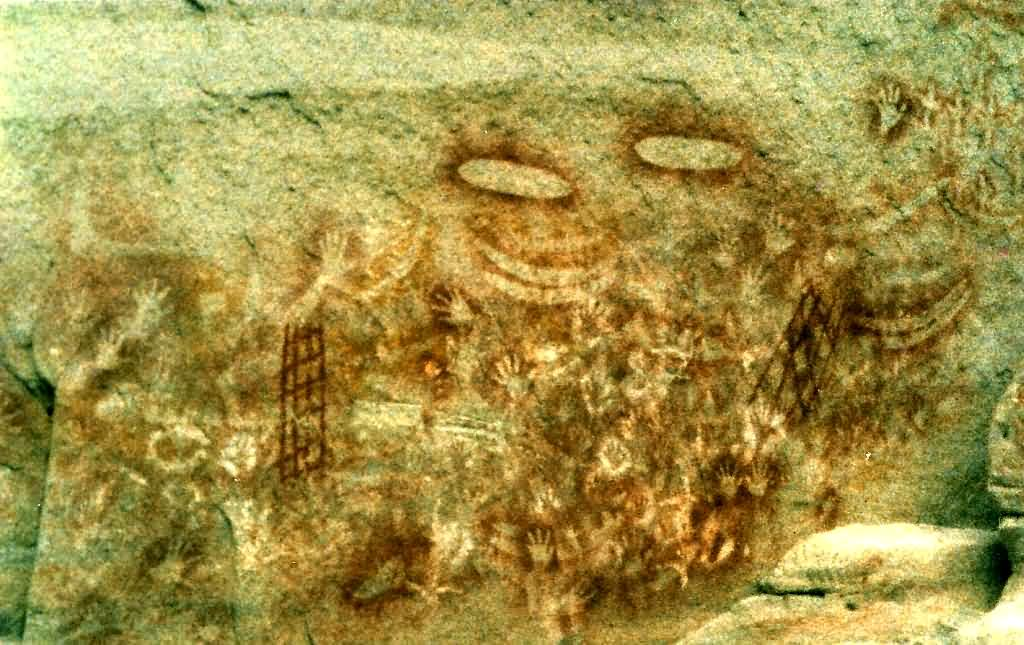
Aboriginal stencil art showing unique clan markers and dreamtime stories symbolising attempts to catch the deceased's spirit.

The beginnings of Australian mythology center on the Aboriginal belief system known as Dreamtime, which dates back as far as 65,000 years. Aboriginals believed Earth was created by spiritual beings who physically represented the land, sea, animals and people. 'Everything in the natural world is a symbolic footprint of the metaphysical beings whose actions created our world." Through practices such as storytelling, dance and art, Dreamtime provided the foundation for Aboriginal culture and spirituality.

== Colonial myths and folklore ==
Since European settlement, Australian mythology shifted away from Dreamtime and focused more on the ideals of the average Australian worker. A strong central theme was rebellion, with stories of common heroes who "laugh in the face of adversity, face up to great difficulties and deliberately go against authority and the establishment".

These figures were further romanticised during the Australian gold rushes, lovingly dubbed The Diggers by the public; who wrote songs, poetry and generally idealised them and their lives. This proved influential on a more mainstream level with soldiers serving in World War I also dubbed The Diggers, a name that still stands today.

== Bunyip ==
Bunyip is a large mythical creature from Aboriginal mythology which is said to lurk in swamps or billabongs and eat people from the shoreline. While descriptions vary, the creature is said to be a reptilian marsupial hybrid, with sizes comparable to "a large dog", and displays of violent, territorial behavior. It was also said to make roar-like noises before devouring prey.

The word itself similarly translates to "demon", "devil", or "evil spirit" in the English language, although it is not exactly clear what the direct definition is. The first reported sighting of a Bunyip was in 1818 in New South Wales, or NSW, a state on the east coast of Australia. In many Aboriginal stories, the Bunyip acts as a deterrent against overexploitation in a metaphoric way. This includes acts such as overfishing and polluting waters. Stories about the Bunyip serve as a means of cultural education, passing down important knowledge from generation to generation. Mythology consistently names swamps and rivers as the preferred home of the Bunyip, stating that settlement over the years disrupted the creature, causing it to attack locals. Witnesses would claim the creature often "preferred" to attack women and children.

== Drop Bear ==
Drop Bear is a mythical Australian marsupial from Australian mythology which stemmed from Europeans. Drop Bears are said to be large, carnivorous koalas that inhabit tree tops and attack their prey by dropping on their heads from above. The myth is often considered humorous by Australians, who simply exaggerate the behavioral traits of koalas which are typically passive creatures.

== Yowie ==
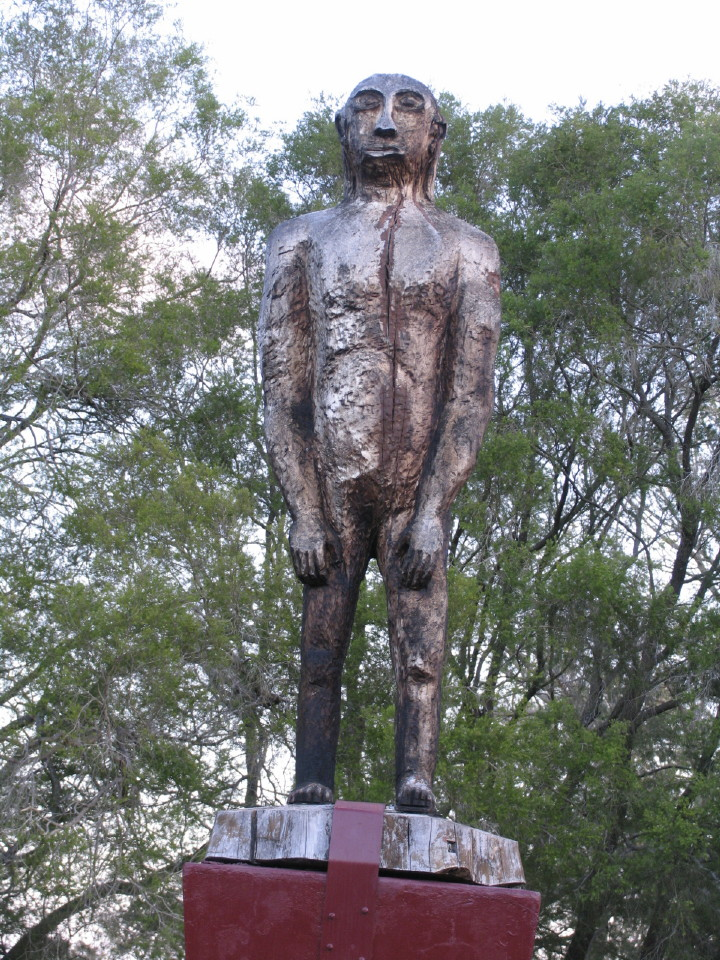
Statue of a Yowie

Yowie is a mythical/cryptid hominid purported to live in the Australian wilderness. The creature stems from both European/Aboriginal mythology. Described as "long, narrow" humanlike creatures, the Yowies were said to be territorial and primitive in nature. In some cases, the Yowies were cannibals, hunting and feasting on human victims caught in their elaborate traps. The legend garnered mainstream public attention in the 1990s, when confectionery company Cadbury created chocolates associated with the mythology. Six characters were created, all human-marsupial hybrids. Related merchandising, such as magazines, centered on endangered species and caring for the environment.

== See also ==
- Australian Aboriginal religion and mythology
- Australian folklore
- Culture of Australia
- Dreamtime
