= Blessed Unrest (album) =

Studio album by The Holy Sea
- Released: 2000
- Recorded: 1999

The Holy Sea chronology
Blessed Unrest (2000)	A Beginner's Guide to the Sea (2008)

Blessed Unrest is the first album by Perth band The Holy Sea.

The album was recorded in 1999 at Jewell Studios in Perth by Tim Jewell and was released in 2000.

The cover art was designed by Girish Sagaram.

The album was critically well received in Perth, with The West Australian noting:

Occasionally there is a schism in the music world, an unexpected tremor of greatness. Henry F. Skerritt, young visionary and pending poet, displays a hope of this. With his band the Holy Sea, this debut aches Nick Cave – with hauntings of Nick Drake – and rattles the soul. Eavesdrop 1984 is stunning and evocative with brooding depth from the cello, lasting the record through. Como employs minimal orchestration but retains the soulful, provoking depth of a moody genius: further proved in Moksha. Disturbing and enlightening, Blessed Unrest suggests greater things to come.

— Julian Tompkin, The West Australian

== Track listing ==
All tracks are written by Henry F. Skerritt.

No.	Title	Length
1.	"Eavesdrop 1984"	5:20
2.	"Sacrifice"	3:32
3.	"Immortal"	2:29
4.	"Como"	3:49
5.	"Moksha"	6:05
6.	"Delaville Blues"	3:24
7.	"Better Than Me"	4:17
8.	"End Song"	7:05

== Musicians ==
- Henry F. Skerrit – Vocals, Guitar, Piano
- David Bryceland – Drums
- Cameron Knight - Bass
- Kate Mathewson – Cello
- Peter Thomsett – Guitar
- Duncan Mah – Guitar
- Matthew Ford – Rhodes
- Chris Cobillis – Lap Steel
- Ben Basell – Organ
