= Basil Sellers =

Indian-Australian business executive (born 1935)

Basil Sellers AO (born in 1935) is an Indian-born Australian businessman and philanthropist. He is also involved in sports and art.

== Early life ==
Sellers was born in India and grew up in the Anglo-Indian Railway Colonies, where he developed an early interest in sports such as badminton, tennis, and cricket. In 1986, he migrated with his family to Australia, and was educated at King's College, Adelaide.

== Career ==
Sellers has held leadership roles in several companies, including as the chief executive and major shareholder of Linter Group Ltd. He was associated with Gestetner PLC, a UK-listed company later acquired by Ricoh. Additionally, he has invested in media and mineral resources through AFP.

== Honors ==
Sellers was appointed a Member of the Order of Australia (AM) in the 2003 Australia Day Honours for "service to the community as a philanthropist through donations to a number of charitable and community organisations, to sports development, and to business". He was promoted to Officer of the Order of Australia (AO) in the 2026 Australia Day Honours for "distinguished service to the community through philanthropy and leadership, and to sports administration".

In February 2018, Sellers was awarded an honorary doctorate by Bond University in recognition of his charitable work, sports development, and business acumen.

In December 2023, he was granted SCG Life Membership for his philanthropy, a status held by 45 people.

== Sports ==
Sellers played senior basketball and represented South Australia when the team won the 1958 Australian Championship. During the 1980s, he owned the Newcastle Basketball team and worked as a Director of the New South Wales Cricket Association (now Cricket New South Wales) from 1984 to 1987. He is a life member of Cricket NSW. His charitable contributions include donations to the McGrath Foundation.

He has donated to sporting initiatives and scholarships, such as the Barassi Scholarship and the Sydney Swans. He has also contributed to the club's football centre at the SCG

Sellers is one of the founders of the Bradman Museum in Bowral, New South Wales, and a life member of the Bradman Foundation. He founded a respite centre in Moruya for elite athletes from the Australian Institute of Sport in Canberra, and similar centres in Tweed Heads.

== Art ==
The Basil Sellers Art Prize was founded in 2004 by Sellers in the Eurobodalla Shire.

February 2019 the official opening of the Basil Sellers Exhibition Centre (the Bas) in Moruya, as the region's first purpose-built exhibition space.

== Sports and art ==
Sellers is an art collector and patron. Collecting for over 35 years, his collection contains post-war Australian art and many of the European modernists, with a particular interest in the Fauves (1906/7). Sellers has also funded the bi-annual art prize of $15,000 in the Southeast of New South Wales.

In 2007, Sellers launched the Basil Sellers Art Prize, initiated in 2008 in association with the Ian Potter Museum of Art, the University of Melbourne. The first prize of $100,000 is awarded to an Australian who produces a piece of art with a sports image. The award bridges the gulf that exists and connects art and sport and is bi-annual.

In 2009, Sellers' philanthropic support led to the establishment of the inaugural National Sports Museum Basil Sellers Creative Arts Fellowship. This bi-annual fellowship allows contemporary artists to explore themes related to Australia's sporting heritage using the collections of the National Sports Museum at the MCG. It aims to expand educational and public programs and foster discussions on the intersection of sport and art.

He has recently concluded the Basil Sellers Sports Sculpture Project of ten sculptures erected at the Sydney Cricket Ground and Adelaide Oval.

== Other initiatives and donations ==
Sellers is involved in the promotion and investment of wine. He is a sponsor of the Len Evans Tutorial, which aims to improve the quality of Australian wines by training and giving access to the world's best wines for wine judges, winemakers, and sommeliers.

== Patronage ==
Sellers is a First XI patron of the Steve Waugh Foundation and a supporter of the Pick Me UP wheelchair service for the Sir Roden & Lady Cutler Foundation. He is a member of the LBW Trust, which educates disadvantaged youth in developing cricket-playing countries, and the Chappell Foundation, which seeks to help young homeless people in Australia.

== Personal life ==
Sellers' only sibling, Rex Sellers, was a test cricketer for Australia, but an injury restricted him to play just 1 Test.

== Books ==
- From India with Love by Dr. Gloria Jean Moore, 2006 – ISBN 0-9579021-2-3
