= The Holy Sea =

Australian rock band

Background information
- Origin: Perth, Western Australia, Australia
- Genre: Folk rock
- Years active: 1999–present
- Members: Henry F. Skerritt; Daniel Hoey; Victor Utting; F. David Bower; Gavin Vance; Gareth Skinner; Emma Frichot
- Past members: Andrew Fuller; David Bryceland; Andrew Weir; Kate Mathewson; Matthew Ford; Cameron Knight
- Website: www.holysea.com.au

The Holy Sea are an Australian rock band that was formed in Perth, Western Australia in 1999 by frontman Henry F. Skerritt. The band relocated to Melbourne in 2004.

== History ==
=== The Perth years (1999–2003) ===
The Holy Sea was formed in Perth in 1999 by singer-songwriter Henry F. Skerritt. The group originally performed under the moniker Henry F. Skerritt and the Holy Sea. In 2000, the band released their debut album Blessed Unrest to critical acclaim, with The West Australian declaring it a work of "provoking depth" and "moody genius".

=== The Melbourne years (2003–present) ===
In 2003, Skerritt moved to Melbourne to study Australian art history at the University of Melbourne before taking up a position as curator at a Melbourne gallery. Between 2003 and 2007, Skerrit performed sporadically around Melbourne as both a solo artist and accompanied by keyboard player Daniel Hoey. In 2007, Skerritt and Hoey decided to reform The Holy Sea to record their second album A Beginner's Guide to the Sea. Skerritt and Hoey reunited with original member Victor Utting and newly recruited drummer F. David Bower. They were joined in the studio by cellist Gareth Skinner, bassist Andrew Fuller, pedal-steel player Garrett Costigan and vocalist Emma Frichot who would all soon join the group on a permanent basis.

Although not a commercial success, A Beginner's Guide to the Sea was met with critical acclaim with Drum Media declaring it "evocative, rousing, brilliant!" Reviewers favourably compared the band to The Triffids, The Go-Betweens, Nick Cave and the Bad Seeds and The Drones.

In 2009, The Holy Sea was invited by Nick Cave to perform at the All Tomorrow’s Parties festival at Mount Buller in Victoria, Australia.

In October 2009, The Holy Sea released the double A-single "Bad Luck/King of Palm Island". "King of Palm Island" recounts the death in custody of Palm Island resident Cameron Doomadgee. The singles preceded the 2010 release of the album Ghosts of the Horizon, The Holy Sea's most critically successful album, garnering positive reviews in media outlets across Australia. It was nominated for the Australian Rolling Stone Award for "Album of the Year".

== Discography ==
=== Albums ===
- Blessed Unrest (2000)
- A Beginner’s Guide to the Sea (2008)
- Ghosts of the Horizon (2010)

=== Singles/EPs ===
- "Paddy, There’s Got to Be One More Bar Open"/"Ghost Town" (2008)
- "Bad Luck"/"King of Palm Island" (2009)
