= The Merger (film) =

- DVD cover
- Directed by: Mark Grentell
- Screenplay by: Damian Callinan
- Produced by: Anne Robinson; Mark Grentell; Damian Callinan
- Starring: Damian Callinan; John Howard; Kate Mulvany
- Cinematography: Tony Luu
- Music by: David Bridie
- Production company: Crow Crow Productions Dream Genie Pictures Pty Ltd Definition Films
- Distributed by: Umbrella Entertainment Pty Ltd
- Release dates: 11 August 2018 (Melbourne Film Festival); 30 August 2018
- Running time: 103 minutes
- Country: Australia
- Language: English

The Merger is a 2018 Australian drama comedy film based on comedian Damian Callinan's critically acclaimed solo show of the same name. The film explores the decline of a cash-strapped rural football club and the recruitment of refugees to keep the club viable. The tagline for this film is "If they can play, they can stay."

== Cast ==
- Damian Callinan as Troy Carrington
- John Howard as Bull Barlow
- Kate Mulvany as Angie Barlow
- Fayssal Bazzi as Sayyid
- Rafferty Grierson as Neil Barlow
- Nick Cody as Goober
- Josh McConville as Snapper
- Angus McLaren as Carpet Burn
- Penny Cook as Fran Barlow
- Stephen Hunter as Neville
- Ben Knight as Harpo
- Harry Tseng as Tou Pou
- Sahil Saluja as Suresh
- Francis Kamara as Didier
- Zenia Starr as Navina
- Aaron Gocs as Porterhouse
- Michelle Brasier as Gretchen
- Haya Arzidin as Fazela
- Lucia Smyrk as Troy's Mum
- Gavin Baskerville as Gavin / Head Morris Dancer / Medieval Performer
- Michael Morley as Morris Dancer / Medieval Performer / Goal Umpire

== Synopsis ==
The rural New South Wales town of Bodgy Creek is struggling: with drought, job scarcity (after the timber mill was shut down), and with racism. The film focuses on the Roosters (a local football team) which is in financial strife. The team faces a dilemma - either they will have to merge with another club or fold.

Living a hermit-like existence on the town's fringe, former football star Troy Carrington (Damian Callinan), is coaxed into rescuing the team after striking up an unlikely friendship with young Neil (Rafferty Grierson). Neil, who is struggling with the recent loss of his father, decides to trust Troy despite the fact that he is a disgraced local who most people blame for the town's decline (he led a protest to close down the timber mill, leading to mass job losses.) Thus, Troy is given a chance for redemption – a second go at saving the town he allegedly destroyed.

Teaming up with Neil's mum Angie (Kate Mulvany) who runs a nearby refugee support centre, they unite to recruit the new arrivals to save the team and take the community on a journey of change. But for some, like Neil's grandfather and Club President, Bull (John Howard) and ‘star’ player Carpet Burn (Angus McLaren), it's more change than they're willing to take. Bull wants to stick with tradition and is angered by the fact that his daughter-in-law, Angie wants to change it up and make a move for the future. He organises a petition to protest against refugees joining the team and even arranges for protesters to picket at training.

The film is a commentary on Australia's refugee policy and the racism it generates. Through hearing characters like Tou Pou (a refugee from Laos), Sayyid (a Syrian refugee) and Didier (who fled from Burundi) speak about their experiences, the other players begin to empathise with their experience. In the resolution of the film, the players (and the broader community) learn to accept people for who they are and what they can offer a community. Viable employment is also found for many of the skilled migrants as Angie and Troy discover that a funding grant exists to encourage organisations to employ refugees as builders (to fix the clubhouse which has been condemned due to asbestos.)

According to Film Ink "The Merger is busting with great gags and loveable characters, and its messages about tolerance and the value of mateship are timely and well placed."

== Production and release ==
The movie was filmed in Wagga Wagga and environs, New South Wales. Production was completed in 2017 and the film was released on 30 August 2018 to Australian and New Zealand theatres.

== Soundtrack ==
SONG TITLE	CREDIT
Come Back Again	Written by Ross Wilson (as R. Wilson) (Mushroom Music) Performed by Daddy Cool
The Colour of Your Jumper	Written by Archie Roach (as A. Roach) (Mushroom Music) Performed by Archie Roach (as A. Roach)
Meet Me in the Middle of the Air	Composed by Paul Kelly Performed by Paul Kelly and Stormwater Boys
I'm Gonna Play on the Wing For Jesus	Written by Andrew Carswell/My Friend the Chocolate Cake David Bridie Courtesy of Mushroom Records
Love Thy Opponent	Written by David Bridie
