= John Howard (Australian actor) =

Australian actor

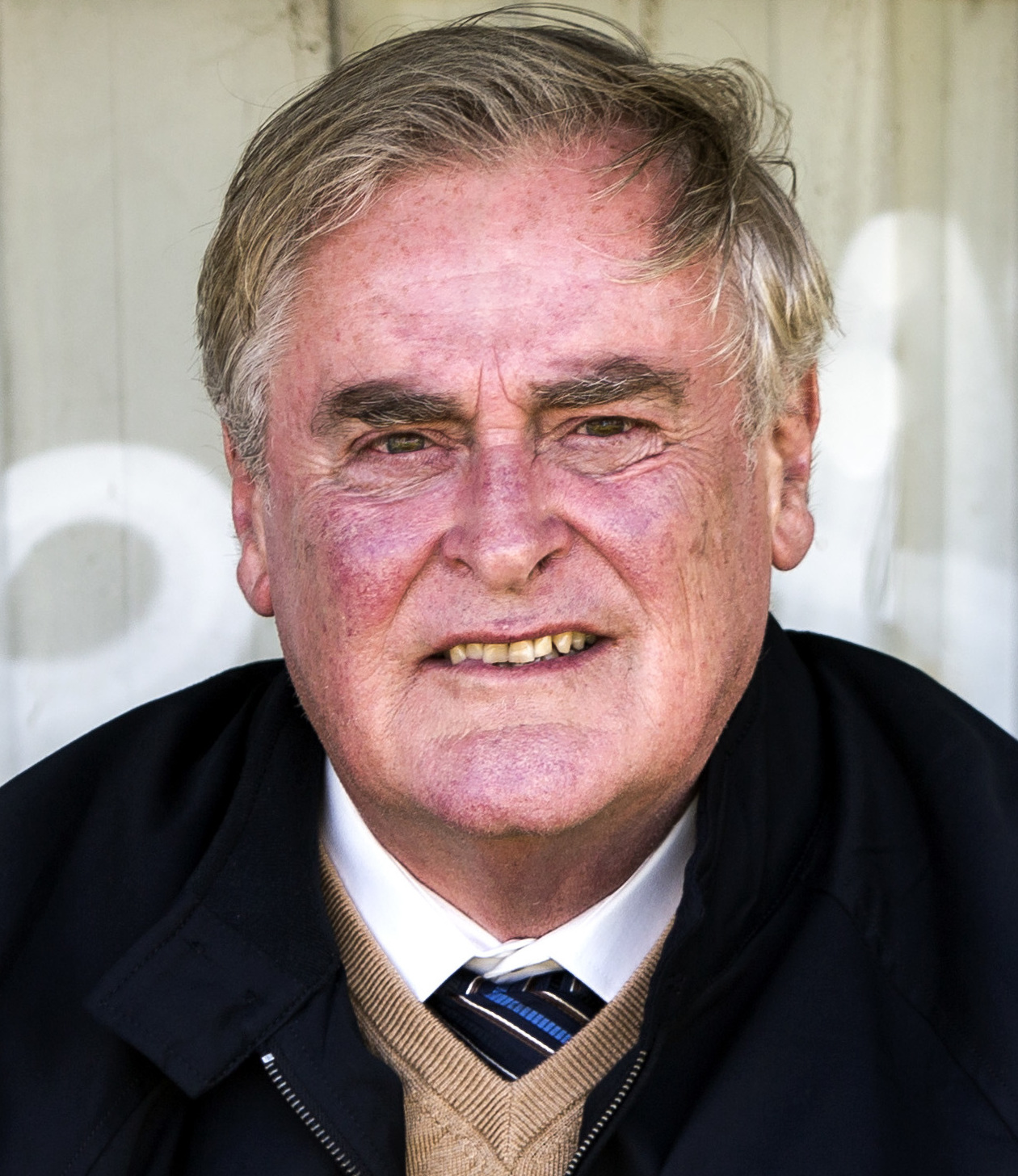
- Born: 22 October 1952 (age 73); Corowa, New South Wales, Australia
- Occupation: Actor
- Years active: 1978−present
- Known for: Film - Mad Max: Fury Road, Furiosa: A Mad Max Saga; Television -: All Saints; Blue Heelers; Seachange; Always Greener; Packed to the Rafters

John Howard (born 22 October 1952) is an Australian stage and screen actor. He is best known for his appearances in the Mad Max film franchise as The People Eater, as well as his regular roles in television series and soap operas All Saints, Blue Heelers, SeaChange, Always Greener, and Packed to the Rafters.

== Early years ==
Howard was born in Corowa, New South Wales. He graduated from the National Institute of Dramatic Art (NIDA).

== Career ==
=== Film ===
Howard's first film role was in The Club. He appeared in the 1988 film Young Einstein, the 2001 film The Man Who Sued God, the 2006 film Jindabyne and had a minor supporting role in the 2012 Australian comedy Any Questions for Ben?, along with the 2015 released Australian road film Last Cab to Darwin.

In 2015, he also starred in George Miller's Mad Max: Fury Road as The People Eater, a role he reprised in 2024 in the film's prequel, Furiosa: A Mad Max Saga.

=== Television serials and soaps ===
Howard is also a television actor and has appeared in a number of Australian programs. He began his career as in Young Ramsay as Bob Scott (1979–1980) starred in the children's program The Girl from Tomorrow as the evil Silverthorn, and he played Frank Reilly in Wildside (1997–1998),

Regular roles include Bob Jelly in SeaChange (1998–2000) and John Taylor in Always Greener (2001–2003). He also played Dr. Frank Campion in the Australian medical TV drama All Saints (2004–2009). He had a role in Packed to the Rafters for a season (2010–2011) and the first series of the ABC drama Janet King.

=== Theatre ===
Howard served as the associate director of Sydney Theatre Company between 1992 and 1996. He also acted numerous roles in plays including Shrine, Rising Water, Mongrels, The Crucible, Life of Galileo, Dead White Males, and Measure for Measure.

== Filmography ==
=== Film ===
| Year | Title | Role | Notes | Ref. |
|---|---|---|---|---|
| 1979 | My Boys are Good Boys | Grocery Store Owner (uncredited) | | |
| 1980 | The Club | Geoff Hayward | | |
| 1981 | Experiment in Romance | | Short film | |
| 1983 | September '51 | Paul | Short film | |
| 1983 | Gary's Story | Gary | Short film | |
| 1983 | Bush Christmas | Sly | | |
| 1984 | Razorback | Danny | | |
| 1984 | Strikebound | Bashed Scab | | |
| 1985 | The Club | Geoff | Video (voice) | |
| 1985 | Best Enemies | Read | | |
| 1985 | Wrong World | Extra | | |
| 1986 | My Country | David Silvermen | | |
| 1988 | Young Einstein | Preston Preston | | |
| 1988 | Evil Angels | Lyle Morris | (aka A Cry in the Dark) | |
| 1988 | Around the World in 80 Ways | Dr. Proctor | | |
| 1994 | The Gap | Waiter | Short film | |
| 1996 | Tease | Graham | Short film | |
| 1996 | Dating the Enemy | Davis | | |
| 1997 | Blackrock | Kirby | | |
| 1999 | In a Savage Land | Reverend Macgregor | | |
| 2001 | The Man Who Sued God | Edward Piggott | | |
| 2003 | Take Away | Burgies CEO | | |
| 2003 | Japanese Story | Richards | | |
| 2004 | A Man's Gotta Do | Eddy | | |
| 2006 | Jindabyne | Carl | | |
| 2010 | In Silence | Fred | Short film | |
| 2012 | Any Questions for Ben? | Priest | | |
| 2014 | Grace Under Water | Ken | Short film | |
| 2014 | Twisted Minds | Greg Tinley | | |
| 2015 | UnIndian | Mr. Saunders | | |
| 2015 | 1919 | The Doctor | Short film | |
| 2015 | Last Cab to Darwin | Simmo | | |
| 2015 | Mad Max: Fury Road | The People Eater | | |
| 2018 | Extra Time | Bill Langham | | |
| 2018 | The Merger | Bull Barlow | | |
| 2022 | Talk Back | | Short film | |
| 2024 | Furiosa: A Mad Max Saga | The People Eater | | |

=== Television ===
| Year | Title | Role | Notes | Ref. |
|---|---|---|---|---|
| 19?? | The Austronauts | Commander Buck Harrington | TV film | |
| 1980 | Water Under the Bridge | Archie | 6 episodes | |
| 1980 | Young Ramsay | Bob Scott | 2 episodes | |
| 1981 | Bellamy | Priest | Episode: "Fizz" | |
| 1981 | Cop Shop | Edward Whitelaw | 2 episodes | |
| 1981 | A Town like Alice | Donald Paget | Episode #1.1 | |
| 1982 | The Highest Honor | Captain R.C. Page | TV film | |
| 1982–1989 | A Country Practice | Hamish Dalton / Julian Cockburn / Sandy McIntosh | 6 episodes | |
| 1983 | Carson's Law | Len Cartwright | 2 episodes | |
| 1983 | Silent Reach | Peter Mountford | 2 episodes | |
| 1985 | Heart of the High Country | Ginger | 6 episodes | |
| 1986 | Studio 86 | Author | Episode: "Restoration Place" | |
| 1988 | Richmond Hill | Bob Russell | TV series | |
| 1991 | The Flying Doctors | Mike Stone | Episode: "Father & Son" | |
| 1991–1992 | The Girl from Tomorrow | Silverthorn | 23 episodes | |
| 1993 | Joh's Jury | Hedley | TV film | |
| 1995 | G.P. | John Schueler | Episode: "Still Life" | |
| 1995 | Blue Heelers | Michael Fielding | Episode: "Out of Harm's Way" | |
| 1995 | Singapore Sling: Road to Mandalay | Conrad Wolf | TV film | |
| 1997–1998 | Wildside | Franky Reilly | 5 episodes | |
| 1998 | Pacific Blue | Dwayne Farrell | Episode: "Cruz Control" | |
| 1998 | State Coroner | Steve Coombs | Episode: "On Thin Ice" | |
| 1998 | Children's Hospital | Len Larkin | Episode: "Home Truths" | |
| 1998 | Never Tell Me Never | Uncle Darryl | TV film | |
| 1998–2019 | SeaChange | Bob Jelly | 47 episodes | |
| 1999 | Water Rats | Sven Larsen | 2 episodes | |
| 1999 | Heartbreak High | Tony Moss | Episode #7.16 | |
| 1999 | Flipper | Jack Cawley | Episode: "Lost and Found" | |
| 2000 | The Games | John Howard | Episode: "Land Claim" | |
| 2001 | Changi | Ken | Episode: "Gordon's Will" | |
| 2001 | Stingers | Robert Lake | Episode: "Family Values" | |
| 2001–2003 | Always Greener | John Taylor | 50 episodes | |
| 2001–2009 | All Saints | Jonathan Healy / Dr. Frank Campion | 232 episodes | |
| 2002 | Tanya and Floyd | Teddy | TV film | |
| 2002 | The Road from Coorain | Angus | TV film | |
| 2004 | Jessica | Georgie Thomas | Miniseries | |
| 2008 | The Real Seachange | Narrator | TV series | |
| 2010–2012 | Packed to the Rafters | Tom Jennings | 17 episodes | |
| 2011 | City Homicide | Alan Sullivan | 5 episodes | |
| 2014 | Janet King | Steven Blakely | 2 episodes | |
| 2016 | Soul Mates | Sarge | 4 episodes | |
| 2017 | The Warriors | Bill Shepard | 8 episodes | |
| 2019 | Get Krack!n | Bill Langham | 2 episodes | |
| 2021 | Bump | Hippy | Episode: "Driftwood" | |
| 2024 | Colin from Accounts | Brian Crapp | 1 episode | |
| 2026 | Who The Hell is Hamish? | TBA | TV series | |

== Awards ==
| Year | Awards | Category | Nominated work | Result | Ref. |
|---|---|---|---|---|---|
| 1989 | ARIA Music Awards | Best Classical Album | Australia Day / Child of Australia (with Sydney Symphony Orchestra, Australian Youth Orchestra, & Joan Carden) | Nominated | |
| 1991 | Sydney Critics Circle Awards | Best Stage Actor | | Won | |
| 1992 | Variety Club of Australia | Stage Actor Heart Award | N/A | Won | |
| 2001 | Logie Awards | Most Outstanding Actor in a Series | SeaChange | Won | |
| 2009 | Sydney Critics Circle Awards | Best Stage Actor | | Won | |

Howard was also the recipient of the Centenary Medal, for Service to the Arts and the Community.
