= Colin Thiele bibliography =

The following is a complete list of books and other writings by Colin Thiele, the prolific Australian children's writer.

== Children's books ==
- Ab Diver, 1988
- Aftershock, The sequel to Shatterbelt, 1992
- Albatross Two, 1974
- The Australian ABC, 1992
- The Australian Mother Goose, 1992
- The Australian Mother Goose II, 1994
- Ballander Boy, 1979
- Billy Bilby's Barbecue, 2005
- Blue Fin, 1969
- Brahminy: The Story of a Boy and a Sea Eagle, 1995
- The Cave & The Glory of a Galumph, 1989
- Chadwick's Chimney, 1979
- Charlie Vet's Pet, 1992
- Coorong Captive, 1985
- Dad Drains The Oil, 1988
- Dangerous Secret, 1997
- Danny's Egg, 1989
- Emma Keppler: Two Months In Her Life, 1991
- Farmer Pelz's Pumpkins, 1990
- Farmer Schulz's Ducks, 1986
- February Dragon, 1966
- The Fire In The Stone, 1973
- Flash Flood, 1970
- Flip-Flop and Tiger Snake, 1970
- Gemma's Christmas Eve, 1994
- Gloop: The Bunyip, 1962
- Gloop the Gloomy Bunyip, 1970
- The Hammerhead Light, 1976
- High Valley Montville, 1996
- Jodie's Journey, 1988
- Klontarf, 1988
- Landslide, 1997
- Little Tom Little, 1981
- Magpie Island, 1974
- The March of Mother Duck, 1993
- Martin's Mountain, 1993
- Miss Bilby, 2007
- The Monster Fish, 1999
- Mr Dumby's Ducks, 2006
- Mrs Munch and Puffing Billy, 1967
- The Mystery of the Black Pyramid, 1996
- Pannikin and Pinta, 2000
- Patch Comes Home, 1982
- Pinquo, 1983
- Pitch The Pony, 1984
- Potch Goes Down The Drain, 1984
- The Rim of the Morning: Six Stories, 1966
- River Murray Mary, 1979
- Rotten Egg, & Paterson To The Rescue, 1989
- The Sea Caves, 2000.
- Seashores and Shadows, 1985.
- The Shadow on the Hills, 1977
- Shadow Shark, 1985
- Sharks in the Shadows, 1985
- Shatterbelt, 1987
- The Sknuks, 1977
- Speedy, 1991
- Stories Short and Tall, 1989
- Storm Boy, 1963
- The Sun on the Stubble, 1961
- Sun Warm Memories: The Colin Thiele Reciter, 2003
- Swan Song, 2002
- Tanya and Trixie, 1980
- Thiele Tales: Three Long Stories for Children, 1980
- Timmy, 1993
- Uncle Gustav's Ghosts, 1974
- The Undercover Secret, 1982
- The Valley Between, 1981
- Wedgetail, 2003
- Wendy's Whale, 1999
- Yellow Jacket Jock, 1969

== Fiction ==
- Labourers in the Vineyard, 1970
- The Seeds' Inheritance, 1986

== Short story ==
- The Ghost of Gartenschmuck, from A Handful of Ghosts: Thirteen Eerie Tales by Australian authors; collected by Barbara Ker Wilson. 1976

== Educational ==
- Australian Poets Speak; Edited by Colin Thiele and Ian Mudie. 1961
- Beginners, Please! One-Act Plays for Schools; Compiled by Colin Thiele and Greg Branson. 1964
- Blue Fin, Educational Companion. 1978
- The Book and the Media, 1976
- Favourite Australian Stories; Compiled by Colin Thiele. 1963
- Handbook to Favourite Australian Stories; Compiled by Colin Thiele. 1964
- The Living Stage: One-Act Plays for Secondary Schools: Book 2; Edited by Colin Thiele and Greg Branson. 1970
- Looking at Poetry; Edited by Colin Thiele. 1960
- One-Act Plays for Secondary Schools: Book 3; Compiled by Colin Thiele and Greg Branson.
- Plays for Young Players; Compiled by Colin Thiele and Greg Branson. 1970
- Setting the Stage: One-Act Plays for Secondary Schools: Book 1; Edited by Colin Thiele and Greg Branson. 1969
- The State of our State: Peeping At South Australia, Adelaide, 1952
- Storm Boy, Educational Companion. 1976

== Verse and prose ==
- The Golden Lightning: Poems, 1950
- Edward John Eyre, 1962
- In Charcoal and Conte, 1966
- Jindyworobak Anthology, 1953
- Man in a Landscape, 1960
- Poems in my Luggage, 1989
- Progress to Denial: A Poem, 1945
- Reckless Rhymes, 1994
- Selected Verse, 1970
- Songs for my Thongs, 1982
- Splinters and Shards: Poems, 1945
- Tea for Three, by Max Fatchen and Colin Thiele. 1994

== General literature ==
- The Adelaide Story, 1982
- Barossa Valley Sketchbook, 1968
- The Benedictions of Benjamin Gates, by Arthur Burfield and Colin Thiele. 1977
- The Best of Colin Thiele, 1980
- The Bight, 1976
- Coorong, 1972
- Coorong, 1986
- The Coorong, 1997
- Grains of Mustard Seed, with research by Ron Gibbs. 1975
- Masterpieces, 1977
- Heysen of Hahndorf, 1968
- Heysen's Early Hahndorf, The Early Works of Sir Hans Heysen. 1976
- Lincoln's Place: The Story of an Australian Pioneer Farm, 1978
- The Little Desert, 1975
- Maneater Man: Alf Dean, The World's Greatest Shark Hunter, 1979
- Passing Glances and Glancing Passes: The Role of Teachers Centres, 1977
- Range Without Man: The North Flinders, 1974
- Ranger's Territory: The Story of Frank Woerle, as told to Colin Thiele. 1987
- Some Ideas For Conference Organisers, by Ron O'Hare and Colin Thiele. 1977
- Something To Crow About: A Keyhole Glimpse of South Australia, 1986
- South Australia Revisited, 1986
- With Dew On My Boots: A Childhood Revisited, 1997

== Videos ==
- Cigarettes and Matches, from Sun on the Stubble. 1979
- The Fire In The Stone
- Storm Boy, SAFC. 1976
- Sun on the Stubble, 1996

== Spoken word recordings ==
- Anna, from 5UV. 27 August 1984
- Ballander Boy
- Burke and Wills, AFoA. 1960
- Colin Thiele Travelogue, 1977
- Emma Keppler, 1993
- Farmer Schulz's Ducks, 1987
- Final Assembly of Wattle Park Teachers College, 1972
- In Charcoal & Conte:, Series: Poets Tongue, 1966
- Introducing Blue Fin, 1978
- Look to the Future, 1992
- Magpie Island, 1995
- Pitch the Pony
- Potch Goes Down The Drain
- Public Reading of Poetry and Prose, 1977
- The Seed's Inheritance, 1988
- The Shadow on the Hills, from ABC. 26 September 1979
- The Shark Fishers, from ABC
- The Sknuks, 1987
- Snook Takes A Dip?, Adapted from the novel Blue Fin
- Speedy, 1992
- Stories Short and Tall, 1990
- Storm Boy: A Dramatisation, 1994
- The Sun on the Stubble, from ABC. 1995
- Talking & Reading, 1980
- Tigersnook, Based on Blue Fin, 1979
- The Tuna That Fell Off A Truck, 1979
- The Undercover Secret, from ABC. 1996
- Winners! 2, from ABC. 1998
- With Dew On My Boots, from ABC Audio. 1997

== Articles and miscellanea ==
The articles here are writings with portions, though not the entire work necessarily, attributed to Colin Thiele.

- Kapunda Memories
- Hearts & Minds: Creative Australians and the Environment, with M Pollak and M MacNabb., 2000
- D.B. Kerr and P.G. Pfeiffer's, Lost Angry Penguins, 2000
- ReSearch98: Spotlight On Research In Education, 1998
- Believe In Yourself: Who'd Want To Be A Writer?, 1996
- Big Rig, in Big Rig and Other Poems, 1995
- A Special Place In A Writer's World, 1992
- Meet Colin Thiele, 1992
- Dragnet, in After Dark: Seven Tales To Read At Night, 1992
- Happy Birthday Rippa, 1991
- Hi, I've Got Brown Eyes, from Classroom: The Magazine For Teachers, 1990
- The Kindest Cut: Arthritis Snd Surgery, 1990
- Behind Books, from The Spirit Of Place, 1990
- Change and Short Change, 1990
- The Candle and the Star, 1988
- Foreword in Peter Killey's, My Word - My World, 1986
- Society Expects Too Much Of Education, David Tonkin interviews Colin Thiele. 1985
- A Child's Christmas, from SAM: South Australian Magazine. 1983
- Inside story: Profiles in children's literature, 1983
- Contributions to, Unlimited Scope, 1983
- Foreword in, An Australian Bush Who's Who: Verses and Illustrations, 1983
- Colin Thiele Opinion: The Journal of S.A.E.T.A., September 1982
- Origins and Odysseys: Writers' Childhood Influences, July 1982
- The Part-time Writer: The Agony and the Ecstasy, May 1980
- Childhood and Change, November 1980
- Sunrise and Starshine: A Boyhood Revisited, in The Early Dreaming: Australian Children's Authors on Childhood, 1980
- Foreword from, South Australian Parks and Conservation, November 1979
- The Bathers Opinion: The Journal of S.A.E.T.A., March 1979
- A World of Living Books, 1978
- Foreword from, Our magazine: The Writers Club of the Helping Hand, 1977
- Shall we make a film of your book?, 1976
- Roll on Port Lincoln, 1973
- The Dragon's Rampage, from The Too-Many Professors and Other Stories, 1973
- A Farewell to Wattle Park, 1972
- The Quality of Experience, May 1972
- Things Books Grow From, or Why Books Germinate, and How They Are Affected By The Climate and The Gardner, August 1970
- The Educator at the Party, November 1969
- No Man Bathes Twice In The Same River, August 1968
- Grass Roots and Far Horizons, 1967
- Four poems, for ASEA Bulletin, October 1967
  - Wintering
  - Eclipse
  - Radiation Victim
  - Shall Such A Love
- Creative English in Primary Schools, November 1967
- Storm Boy from Woman's Day, March 1965
- Lady Franklin in South Australia Tradition, April 1964
- Lutheran Landing, Port Misery, 1838, November 1963
- Flying the Bight, November 1962
- Dark Room, November 1962
- School Hymn, for Seacombe High School, 1962
- The Secondary School Teacher, May 1958
- Two Homecomers, November 1943
