= List of Australian sports songs =

List of Australian sports songs covers songs written specifically about Australian sports, sports people, animals and sporting events. It excludes sports team songs or general songs that are anthems for sports events. For example, the song "Down Under" by Men at Work—which became the theme song for the crew of Australia II in their successful bid to win the 1983 America's Cup—is excluded.

Mike Brady, Greg Champion and John Williamson have specialised in writing and performing Australian sports songs. Two Australian sporting heroes, Sir Donald Bradman and Phar Lap, have several songs about them.

Sport	Title	Date	Writer/singer	Comments
Athletics	Our Marjorie	1952	Jack O'Hagan (writer), Alan Coad and the Song Paraders (singers)	Song about the Australian sprinter Marjorie Jackson, known as the Lithgow Flash.
Australian football	One Day in September	1980	Mike Brady (writer/singer)	Anthem for the AFL Grand Final
Australian football	That's the Thing About Football	1994	Greg Champion(writer/singer)	
Australian football	Up There Cazaly	1979	Two Man Band (Mike Brady & Peter Sullivan) (writers/singers)	"Up There Cazaly" is an Australian rules football catchphrase inspired by early 20th century St Kilda and South Melbourne great Roy Cazaly.
Australian football	There's only one Tony Lockett	1999	James Freud (singer)	Highest goal scorer in the history of the VFL/AFL with 1,360 goals in a career of 281 games.
Australian football	One True Game	2002	John Schumann (writer/singer)	
Australian football	Jesaulenko, You Beauty	2012	Tex Perkins & the Dark Horses (writer/singer)	Exclusive song for The Marngrook Footy Show for the Final Siren segment. Alex Jesaulenko took a famous high mark in the 1970 VFL Grand Final.
Australian football	The Back Upon Which Jezza Jumped	1985	TISM – This Is Serious Mum (writer/singer)	Song about Alex Jesaulenko jumping on the back of Collingwood's Graeme Jenkin to take a famous high mark in the 1970 VFL Grand Final.
Australian football	The Swans Return	1987	Weddings Parties Anything (writer/singer)	Song about South Melbourne Football Club move to Sydney to become the Sydney Swans.
Australian football	Colour of Your Jumper	1993	Archie Roach (writer/singer)	Nicky Winmar famously raise his guernsey in response to racial taunts by Collingwood Football Club supporters at Victoria Park, Melbourne.
Australian football	Shut Up – The Footy's on the Radio	2010	TISM (writer/singer)	
Australian football	It all Sounds like football to me (Ted Whitten)	1981	Mike Brady (singer)	Ted Whitten, a legend of the Australian Football League
Australian football	Anthony McDonald-Tipungwuti	2019	Picket Palace	A punk tribute dedicated to Essendon player Anthony McDonald-Tipungwuti, which was made into a popular music video.
Boxing	Ballard of Les Darcy	2012	Russell Morris (singer)	Tribute to boxer Les Darcy
Boxing	Rally around the Drum	1992	Paul Kelly (singer & writer) / Archie Roach (writer)	Song about tent boxing in Australia on Hidden Things album.
Boxing	Jimmy Sharman's Boxers	1984	Midnight Oil	The album Red Sails in the Sunset included this song regarding Jimmy Sharman's boxing troupe.
Cricket	Our Don Bradman	1930	Jack O'Hagan (writer), Art Leonard (singer)	Tribute to Australia's (and the world's) greatest cricketer, Sir Donald Bradman
Cricket	Bradman	1986	Paul Kelly (writer/singer)	
Cricket	Sir Don	1999	John Williamson (writer/singer)	Williamson performed "Sir Don" at Bradman's Memorial Service in Adelaide in 2001.
Cricket	The Tiger and the Don	1990	Ted Egan (writer/singer)	Song about Australian batsman Sir Donald Bradman and spin bowler Bill O'Reilly
Cricket	C'mon Aussie C'mon	1978	Allan Johnston, Alan Morris and other from Mojo (writers/singers)	Advertising jingle to promote World Series Cricket
Cricket	I Made A Hundred in the Backyard at Mum's	2005	Greg Champion (writer/singer)	
Cricket	Cricket's on the Radio	2005	Greg Champion (writer/singer)	
Cricket	Shane Warne	2007	Paul Kelly (writer/singer)	Shane Warne holds the Australian record for the most test wickets.
Cricket	The Baggy Green	2000	John Williamson (writer/singer)	Baggy Green is a cricket cap of green colour, which has been worn by Australian Test cricketers since around the turn of the twentieth century.
Cricket	Victor Trumper	1994	The Lucksmiths (singer)	Victor Trumper was an Australian cricketer (1899–1912)
Cricket	Here Come The Aussies	1972	Daniel Boone & Rod McQueen (writers),1972 Australian Cricket Team (singers)	The anthem of Ian Chappell’s 1972 Ashes squad
Cricket	Nambucca Boy	2015	Urthboy	Tribute to Australian test cricketer Phillip Hughes, who died after being struck on the head by a ball in a 2014 Sheffield Shield game.
Horse racing	Goodbye, Phar Lap, Goodbye	?	R Kreymborg (writer)	Phar Lap, a champion Australian thoroughbred racehorse in the early years of the Great Depression. Sung to the tune Wearing of the Green.
Horse racing	Come on Phar Lap	1983	Alan and Dianne Hawking (writer), Alan Hawking (singer)	
Horse racing	Phar Lap – Farewell to You	1932	Jack Lumsdaine (writer/singer)	
Horse racing	Big Red	2012	Russell Morris (singer)	Tribute to Phar Lap
Horse racing	The Goondiwindi Grey	1973	Nev Hauritz and Brian Wallace (writers), Tex Morton (singer)	Tribute to Gunsynd, a champion Australian thoroughbred racehorse.
Horse racing	That Tuesday in November	2000	Mike Brady(writer/singer)	Unofficial anthem for the Melbourne Cup, an Australian horse race that stops the nation.
Horse racing	The Melbourne Cup	1965	Stan Coster (writer), Slim Dusty (singer)	
Horse racing	Queen in the Sport of Kings	1985	John Williamson (writer/singer)	Australasian Country Music Awards for APRA Song of the Year.
Harness racing	Paleface Adios	1977	Rudy Brandsma and Richard Trembath (writers), Johnny Tapp (singer)	Song about Paleface Adios, winner of over 100 races.
Harness racing	Little Hondo	1974	Lewis Buchanan (writer), Johnny Tapp (singer)	Song about Hondo Grattan, a successful horse in the 1970s.
Paralympic Games	Rise to the Moment	2000	Mike Brady (writer/singer)	Official song for the Australian Paralympic Team at the 2000 Sydney Paralympics
Rugby league	The Rugby League Song	1980	Danny McMaster (writer/singer)	
Rugby union	A Number on My Back	2000	John Williamson (writer/singer)	Australian rugby team Anthem
Tennis	Evonne	1981	Stagecoach Country Band	Tribute to Evonne Goolagong Cawley.

== See also ==
- List of Australian Football League team songs
- Australian rules football in Australian popular culture § Music
