= Alan Morris (advertiser) =

Australian marketing executive (1942–2007)

- Born: 1942; Sydney, New South Wales, Australia
- Died: 1 April 2007 (aged 64); Sydney, New South Wales, Australia
- Other name: Mo
- Occupation: Advertising Creative
- Known for: Advertising agency co-founder Mojo with Allan Johnston

Alan "Mo" Morris (1942– 1 April 2007) was an Australian advertising creative executive, a copywriter who enjoyed particular success in the 1970s and 80s. Together with his long-time business partner Allan Johnston, he formed the Australian advertising agency Mojo which enjoyed much local and some international success in the 1980s and whose name survived till 2016 as Publicis Mojo, the Australian subsidiary of the French multinational advertising and communications company holding Publicis Groupe.

== Advertising pedigree ==
Morris' father Carl Morris was one of the Australian servicemen who upon return from World War II formed the Melbourne ad agency United Service Publicity - he was the agency's Production Manager. The US agency group Needham Harper Steers entered the Australian market in 1967 by taking a stake in United Service Publicity and changed its name in 1972 to USP Needham, whose lineage can be directly traced to today's Melbourne office of DDB Worldwide. Alan Morris' brother Don Morris AO is also an advertising executive and the two worked together at a number of points in their careers with Don being significantly involved in the life of the Mojo agency.

== Career ==
Morris' first job was as a copywriter in Canada while travelling. On his return to Australia he joined Rodgers Holland and Everingham and then Mullins Clarke and Ralph, where he was creative director and had a shareholding. In the mid-1970s he took to freelancing and at one point was teamed with writer Allan Johnston at Hertz Walpole in Sydney. Together they had immediate success as a team working on campaigns for Hertz Walpole's clients Meadow Lea margarine ("You oughta be congratulated") and Tooheys beer ("How do you feel?"). In 1975 started their own consultancy and continuing to work on such accounts as they grew their business. In 1979 their creative consultancy became the full-service ad agency Mojo and Meadow Lea and Tooheys amongst other clients, signed with the new shop.

During the 1980s Mojo was the hottest creative agency in Sydney and Mo and Jo had success jointly authoring World Series Cricket's "C'mon Aussie C'mon" and later the Australian Tourism Commission's spot with Paul Hogan's instruction to put another "Shrimp on the barbie.

The Mojo approach to TV advertisements used a colloquial and irreverent style, often with a catchy jingle to simple accompaniment. Contrasting against the clipped and British-imitating style of voice presenters on Australian TV up till that point, Mojo ads highlighted Australian idiom and its laconic accent. Ads such as "I’m as Australian as Ampol”, "Hit 'em with the Old Pea Beu" (insectide), "Everybody loves Speedo”, "I Can Feel a Fourex Coming on", "Every Amco tells a Story" (for Amco jeans) all came out of the Mojo agency in the 1980s. The use of Peter Allen's I Still Call Australia Home to promote Qantas was developed at Mojo in the late 1980s and until 2011 this campaign concept was still used by Qantas and its ad agencies.

In August 1987 Mojo was acquired by the Melbourne-based publicly listed agency Monaghan Dayman Adams Limited and became MojoMDA. The resultant merged business maintained its listed status until 1989. The Mojo MDA Group had offices in London, New York, San Francisco, Hong Kong, Singapore and affiliates throughout Asia. In 1988 Advertising Age named it as International Agency of the Year.

In August 1989 the Mojo MDA Group was Australia's largest ad agency with billings of $180million and was acquired by the Los Angeles agency Chiat\Day. The merger was unsuccessful and in 1992 Chiat/Day sold off Mojo to Foote, Cone & Belding. In later international dealings which saw FCB acquired by the Interpublic Group, the Australian Mojo offices were sold to Publicis.

Morris had a successful stint at Singleton Ogilvy & Mather from the mid to late '90s. In 1999 he teamed up again with Johnston back at Hertz Walpole when Jim Walpole offered them both a shareholding and that agency was at that point renamed "Morris Johnston Walpole". The re-unification failed to set the advertising world on-fire and in 2002 the veterans accepted an offer for sale from the Japanese multinational communications group Hakuhodo. In 2006 he started an agency named "Yabber" with his brother Don and with TV personality Jamie Durie. A year later Morris lost his ongoing battle with cancer.

== Personal life ==
Alan Morris was at one point married to the Australian television actress and screenwriter Judy Morris. He has a daughter Michaela Morris with Judy and sons Asher and Ronnie with his second ex wife Lissa.

== Accolades ==
Together with Johnston, Morris was acknowledged by his peers with admissions to the Halls of Fame of Campaign Brief (magazine) in 2006 and the Australian Writer and Art Directors Association in 2009. In 2009 Morris & Johnston were included in the inaugural 12 inductees to Ad News magazine's, Australian Advertising Hall of Fame.

In 2007 the Advertising Federation of Australia awarded its AFA Medallion to Mo and Jo describing the pair as "the Lennon & McCartney of Australian advertising".
