= Allan Johnston (advertiser) =

Australian advertising creative executive and copywriter

- Born: Adelaide, South Australia, Australia
- Other name: Jo
- Occupation: Advertising creative
- Known for: Agency co-founder Mojo

Allan "Jo" Johnston is an Australian advertising creative executive and copywriter who was successful as a jingle writer, particularly in the 1970s and 1980s. He was born in Adelaide, Australia. Together with his long-time business partner Alan Morris, he formed the Australian advertising agency Mojo which enjoyed much Australian and some international success in the 1980s and whose name survived until 2016 as Publicis Mojo, the Australian subsidiary of the French multinational advertising and communications company holding Publicis Groupe.

== Career ==
Born in Adelaide Johnston started out as a copywriter in that city before taking a job as an assistant producer in an Adelaide ad agency, then moving into the copy department writing jingles. He relocated to Sydney in 1968, joining an agency called Marketing and Advertising, later to be known as Hertz Walpole Advertising. In the mid 1970s he was teamed with freelance writer Alan Morris and together they had immediate success as a team working on campaigns for Hertz Walpole's clients Meadow Lea margarine ("You oughta be congratulated") and Tooheys beer ("How do you feel?"). In 1973 they left the agency and in 1975 started their own consultancy and continued to work on such accounts as they grew their business. In 1979 their creative consultancy became the full-service ad agency Mojo and Meadow Lea and Tooheys amongst other clients, signed with the new shop.

During the 1970s and 1980s Mojo was the hottest creative agency in Sydney and Mo and Jo had success jointly authoring World Series Cricket's "C'mon Aussie C'mon ". and later the Australian Tourism Commission's spot with Paul Hogan's instruction to put another "shrimp on the barbie".

The Mojo approach to TV advertisements used a colloquial and irreverent style, often with a catchy jingle to simple accompaniment and frequently sung in Jo's own "gravelly" voice. Contrasting against the clipped and British-imitating style of voice presenters on Australian TV up till that point, Mojo ads highlighted Australian idiom and its laconic accent. Ads such as “I’m as Australian as Ampol”, “Hit ‘em with the Old Pea Beu” (insectide), “Everybody loves Speedo”, “I Can Feel a Fourex Coming on”, “Every Amco tells a Story” (for Amco jeans) all came out of the Mojo agency in the 1980s. The use of Peter Allen's I Still Call Australia Home to promote Qantas was developed at Mojo in the late 1980s and until 2011 this campaign concept was still used by Qantas and its ad agencies.

In August 1987 Mojo was acquired by the Melbourne-based publicly listed agency Monaghan Dayman Adams Limited and became MojoMDA. The resultant merged business maintained its listed status until 1989. The Mojo MDA Group had offices in London, New York, San Francisco, Hong Kong, Singapore and affiliates throughout Asia. In 1988 Advertising Age named it as International Agency of the Year. In August 1989 the Mojo MDA Group was Australia's largest ad agency with billings of $180million and was acquired by the Los Angeles agency Chiat\Day. The merger was unsuccessful and in 1992 Chiat/Day sold off Mojo to Foote, Cone & Belding. In later international dealings which saw FCB acquired by the Interpublic Group, the Australian Mojo offices were sold to Publicis.

In 1994 Jo left the employment of the Australian Mojo business and returned to Hertz Walpole as an executive creative director, taking up a shareholding. When Alan Morris finished up a stint at Singleton Ogilvy & Mather in 1999, he took up the opportunity to re-unite with Jo and Jim Walpole and their agency was renamed "Morris Johnston Walpole". The re-unification failed to set the advertising world on-fire and in 2002 the veterans accepted an offer for sale from the Japanese multinational communications group Hakuhodo. As of 2010 the agency which Jo started in 1968 which was then called "Marketing & Advertising" was still in operation and then known as "MJW Hakuhodo".

== Personal life ==
His marriage to his wife Jean is longstanding. Their two sons followed Jo into careers in advertising. He has six grandchildren - three by each son.

== Accolades ==
Together with Morris, Johnston was acknowledged by his peers with admissions to the Halls of Fame of Campaign Brief (magazine) in 2006 and the Australian Writer and Art Directors Association in 2009. In 2007 the Advertising Federation of Australia awarded its AFA Medallion to Mo and Jo describing the pair as "the Lennon & McCartney of Australian advertising". In 2009 Morris & Johnston were included in the inaugural 12 inductees to Ad News Magazine's, Australian Advertising Hall of Fame.
