= James Northfield =

Australian graphic artist (1887–1973)

James Northfield (1887–1973) was an Australian graphic artist active from the 1910s through to the 1960s. He illustrated many commercial and government advertisements which depict Australian scenery, wildlife and daily life and also demonstrate the priorities of the government of the day.

Northfield is best known as the designer of a series of posters for the Australian National Travel Association, who commissioned him, alongside Percy Trompf, Walter Jardine, Eileen Mayo, Gert Sellheim and C. Dudley Wood to promote Australian holiday destinations to local and overseas travellers. Many of these 'Travel Poster' designs were included in the 1999–2000 exhibition Follow the Sun – Australian travel posters 1930s–1950s at the National Library of Australia, and in various other public exhibitions.

Northfield also created a series of patriotic posters during World War II.

A detailed monograph of Northfield's work, James Northfield and the Art of Selling Australia, has been completed by author Michelle Hetherington of the National Museum of Australia.

The James Northfield Heritage Art Trust (JNHAT), a not-for-profit Trust, was registered in October 2002 to preserve, protect and promote Northfield's artworks.
