= Percy Trompf =

Australian commercial artist (1902–1964)

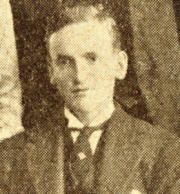
- Born: Percival Albert Trompf; 30 May 1902; Beaufort, Victoria, Australia
- Died: 17 July 1964 (aged 62); Heidelberg, Victoria, Australia
- Education: Ballarat School of Mines
- Style: Art Deco
- Spouse: Vera Johns
- Children: 2

Percival Albert Trompf (1902–1964), was an Australian commercial artist, best known for his travel posters, books, advertising hoardings and pamphlets promoting the nation's tourist industry and Australian and international corporations and companies. His colour lithography was recognised as distinctive during his career and since, Art Deco in style, and innovative in its use of flat colour. Some of his designs depicted historical events, including the construction of the Sydney Harbour Bridge and Captain Cook's landing at Botany Bay, and advanced the iconic value of Australian destinations including the Outback, The Great Barrier Reef, and national identity and activities of sun-worship, surfing and bushwalking, using a visual language of modernity, promotion and consumerism. In turn his imagery has since become valued for its nostalgic evocation of the early mid-century and his posters have become collectible 'national treasures' that are frequently exhibited.

== Early life ==
Percy Trompf (c.1930s) For a Different Holiday, Great Barrier Reef, Colour lithograph

Trompf was born on 30 May 1902 in Beaufort, Victoria, the ninth child of Henry Alexander Trompf, a fruiterer, and his wife Catherine Amelia, née Elliott. His family later moved to Ballarat, and he was educated at Sebastopol Primary School. He developed an enduring interest in cricket and sang and competed as a member of a church choir. He became one of the earliest students at the Ballarat School of Mines' Ballarat Technical Art School where he left with his certificate in 1917, and where he was remembered in 1930, when his posters were exhibited there, as "one of Ballarat's most notable old boys".

== Career ==
In 1923, Trompf began designing confectionery boxes and wrappings for Giles & Richards, a Melbourne firm of commercial artists, before setting up his own studio in Little Collins Street, painting and designing thousands of advertising posters, usually of 25 x 40 inches (64 x 102 cm) format, and 24-sheet advertising hoardings, for which Trompf supervised all stages of production, including the lithographic printing. He also designed books and pamphlets throughout his career.

An early client was Charles Holmes (later editor of Walkabout, also a client) chairman of the Victorian Railways Betterment and Publicity Board under Harold Clapp. Holmes had recognising the successful use of poster advertising by the London Underground's Frank Pick, and hired Trompf for a similar campaign in the 1920s.

By 1931, Trompf was well known as a poster artist. "Scuu" in Smith's Weekly of 8 August 1931, rhetorically asked;

"Does commercial art pay? Well, ask Percy Trompf, who has just had another striking 'Eat More Oranges' poster accepted by Harold Clapp to brighten Victorian railway stations. So many of Percy’s posters are already on railway hoardings that many people believe he is on the permanent payroll. The A.N.T.A. have also adopted his designs—notably the Landing of Captain Cook and the Sydney Harbour Bridge—while the Orient S.S. Co. has just awarded him first prize in the competition to improve its posters"

Clients included the Canadian Pacific Railway, Bryant & May, Palmolive, and the magazine Walkabout established 25 March 1929 by its parent body the Australian National Travel Association. For the latter Trompf produced posters targeted at a limited number overseas who could afford travel, and their designs and content reflect this niche market. By 1930, 100,000 posters had been distributed.

== World War II ==
In May 1942, he enlisted in the Royal Australian Air Force and was commissioned as a pilot in June. Trompf served mostly at Milne Bay, Papua New Guinea, and worked as a camouflage officer. He was demobilized in February 1948, with the rank of flying officer.

== Postwar ==
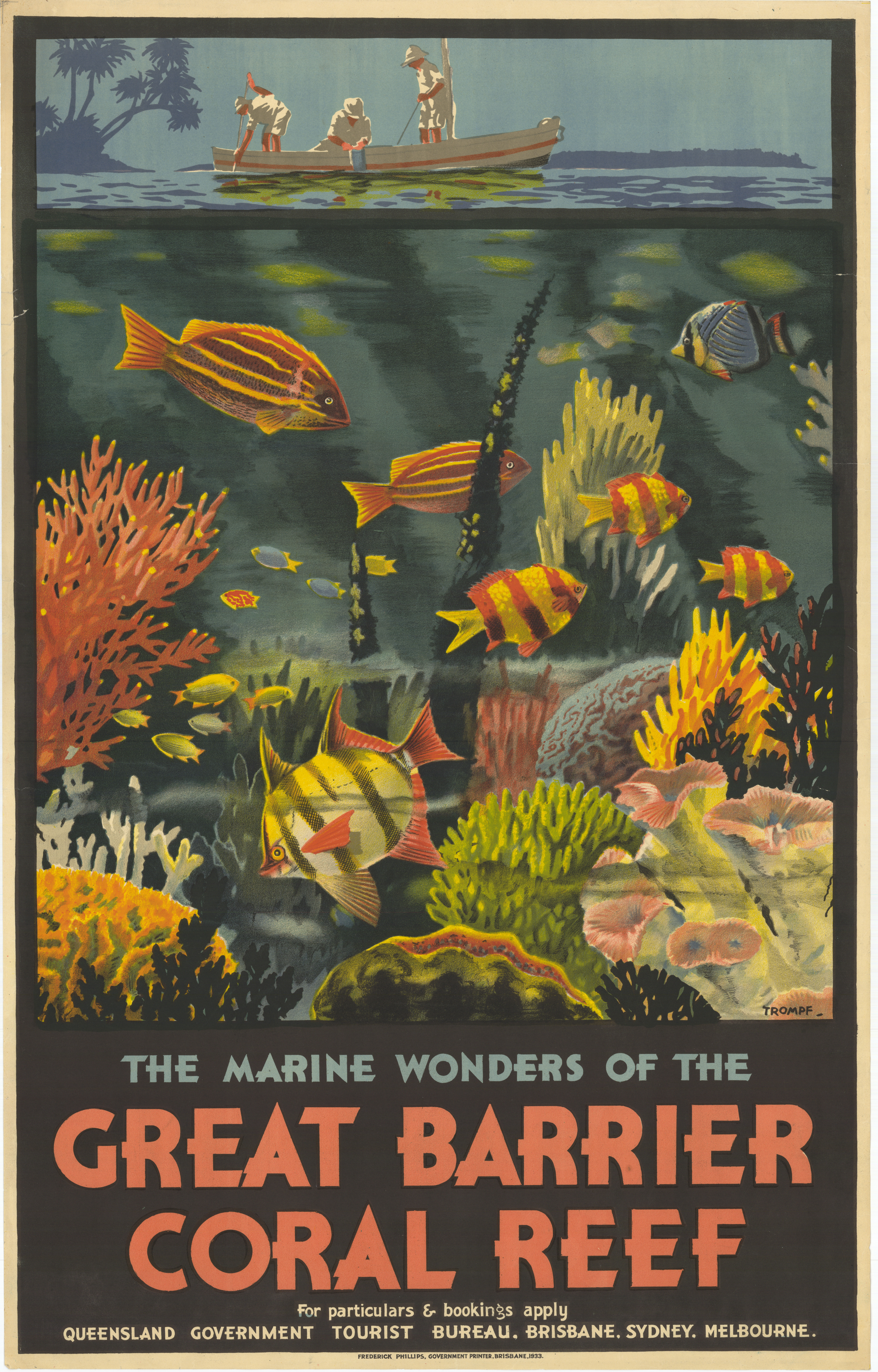
Trompf, Percival Albert (1933), The Marine Wonders of the Great Barrier Coral Reef. Colour Lithograph

Returning to business after the war, Trompf received little work from A.N.T.A and the Victorian Railways. His clientele reduced during the 1950s to the Queensland Government Tourist Bureau, the Commonwealth Railways, and Victorian Education Department for road safety posters. He produced also some book covers, illustration and design, including Under southern skies, on the Dandenong Ranges, Mornington Peninsula and Gippsland for the Australian Publicity Council.

Poster design declined in the 1960s as magazines and travel institutions increasingly used more affordable colour photography rather than specially commissioning graphic illustrations, for the sake of faster turn-around and for more persuasive realism.

== Reception ==
Trompf enjoyed a growing reputation alongside other poster artists James Northfield, Walter Jardine, Eileen Mayo, Gert Sellheim and C. Dudley Wood. In their 1940 report on the first annual show of the Australian Commercial and Industrial Artists’ Association in Sydney, The Bulletin characterised him as "one of the few poster men whose signature is well known." In 1985, surveying Australian representations of beach culture, historian Geoffrey Dutton equates Trompf to Max Dupain, Charles Conder and Sydney Nolan.

The colour lithography that Trompf used produced bold, simplified realism in an Art Deco style, with wide appeal, especially during the Great Depression. Posters exhorted Australians to travel by rail, to eat more fruit to the benefit of the country's struggling primary producers and, against competition from cars and buses contributing to unsustainable rail service deficits, they sought to promote diversity of purposes for travel that might provide new sources of revenue. They promoted the simple joys of sun-worship, surfing and bushwalking, which were then becoming popular alongside a general interest in 'body culture' then pervasive among the young, famously celebrated in Trompf's best-known poster simply titled Australia.

In recent evaluations, Gilfedder, in analysing, as a sample, the visual rhetoric of Trompf's poster for the British market featuring Captain Cook's landing at Botany Bay to invite the traveler to 'Discover Australia', concludes that such travel posters were early instances of 'country branding'. Symes perceives that railway posters of this period using state-of-the-art techniques of the new field of commercial art developed Victoria's tourist geography, locating, labelling, visualising and imbuing places and regions with specific recreational and leisure attributes and Pocock attributes such responsibility, on a whole-of-Australia scale, to Trompf's 1933 poster in advancing the Great Barrier Reef as one of the most significant tourist destinations. Dann and Barnes show how tourism marketing professionals including Trompf created a visual language of modernity, promotion and consumerism.

Barnes cites Trompf's Commonwealth Railway poster as applying an American aesthetic in depicting Central Australia; replacing North American pueblos with Australian indigenous ‘Arunta' men. Juxtaposing modern, white, explorers-cum-tourists with 'primitive natives’ each in formulaic groupings, positions and postures, the colonial figures and their vehicles are given centre- and stage-right to symbolise progress, while Aboriginal men are diminished in scale and backgrounded to represent their servility and symbolic position in the past.

The attractiveness and historical interest of Trompf's posters endure as they are frequently included in public exhibitions, and they have become collectible national treasures. They fetch up to $A12,000 at auction.

== Personal life ==
On 14 May 1932, Trompf married Vera Johns at the Methodist Church, Armadale, Victoria, Melbourne, and they had two daughters. His nephew (b.1940) was religious historian Professor Garry W. Trompf.

Trompf died of a renal infection on 17 July 1964 in Heidelberg, Melbourne.

== Works ==
=== 1920s ===
- Trompf, Percy; Victorian Railways (1920), The holiday spirit, Mt. Buffalo National Park, Victorian Railways
- Trompf, Percy; Victorian Railways (issuing body.) (1923), Take a day at the seaside : go down by train!, [Victorian Railways]
- Trompf, Percy; Victorian Railways; F.W. Niven Pty. Ltd, (printer.) (1924), See the Better Farming Train
- Trompf, Percy; Victorian Railways (1924), See the better farming train : a wonderful exhibition accompanied by experts to help the farmer and lady demonstrators in household affairs to assist the farmer's wife : increased production, reduced costs, farm efficiency, improved stock, Victorian Railways, Australia
- Trompf, Percy; Victorian Railways (issuing body.); Robert Harding Pty Ltd (printer.) (1924), Visit Mt. Buffalo National Park this summer, [Victorian Railways]
- Trompf, Percy; Australian Railways Commissioners (1925), Australia calls you : settler, investor or tourist, Australian Railways Commissioners
- Trompf, Percy; Orient Line Steam Navigation Company (1929), Australia, Orient Line 20,000 ton ships, Orient Line
- Trompf, Percy; Australian National Travel Association (1929), The Landing of Captain Cook at Botany Bay 1770, Australia, Australian National Travel Association
- Trompf, Percy; Australian National Travel Association (issuing body.) (1929), Australia : particulars at shipping and travel agencies, Melbourne Troedel & Cooper Pty. Ltd

=== 1930s ===
- Trompf, Percy; Victorian Railways (1930), Bendigo, the golden city, Victoria, Australia : take a Kodak, Victorian Railways, Australia
- Trompf, Percy; Australian National Travel Association; Northfield Studios; J. E. Hackett (Firm) (1930), Australia for sunshine & romance, Australian National Travel Association
- Trompf, Percy; Victorian Railways (issuing body.); Victoria. State Rivers and Water Supply Commission (issuing body.) (1930), Citrus fruits : give glowing health, [Melbourne] Issued by the Victorian Railways Commissioners in conjunction with the State Rivers & Water Supply Commission
- Trompf, Percy; Trans-Australian Railway (1930), Luxurious travel, night & day : across Australia : save days by the Trans-Australian Railway, Trans-Australian Railway
- Trompf, Percy (1930), Seek the winter sunshine at Mildura, Queen city of the Murray Valley, Issued by the Victorian Railways Commissioners & the Mildura District Tourist Association
- Trompf, Percy, 1902-1964, (illustrator.) (1931), Eat more fruit : take some home today!
- Trompf, Percy, 1902-1964, (artist.); Victoria. State Rivers and Water Supply Commission (issuing body.); Victorian Railways (issuing body.) (1931), Keep fit, eat more fruit : citrus fruits, Victorian Railways
- Trompf, Percy (1930), Mt. Buffalo National Park, Victoria, Australia : Take a Kodak, F.W. Niven, Pty. Ltd
- Trompf, Percy (1930), Seventh city of the Empire - Melbourne, Victoria Collins Street, Melbourne at the corner of Swanston Street, showing corner of Town Hall with clock tower with Manchester Unity Building, traffic in Collins street with tram travelling up Swanston Street
- Trompf, Percy (1930), Australia in the sun, Australian National Travel Association
- Trompf, Percy (1930), Western Australia : Particulars at travel and shipping agencies, Troedel & Cooper, Pty. Ltd
- Trompf, Percy (1930), See for yourself ... Blue Mountain Resorts - N.S.W. : For information, write County Clerk, Box 111, Katoomba, [Publisher not identified]
- Trompf, Percy; Australian National Travel Association (1934), World's Greatest Air Race for Macrobertson Trophy. England to Australia. Victorian Centenary, 1934-1935, Moore, Young Lithography Co., for the Australian National Travel Association
- Trompf, Percy; Queensland Government Tourist Bureau (1934), This will be the place for a village: Victoria and Melbourne Centenary Celebrations, Troedel & Cooper Pty Ltd for the Australian National Travel Association
- Trompf, Percy; Queensland Government Tourist Bureau (1933), The Marine wonders of the Great Barrier Coral Reef : for particulars & bookings apply Queensland Government Tourist Bureau, Brisbane, Sydney, Melbourne, Frederick Phillips, Government Printer
- Trompf, Percy; Queensland Government Tourist Bureau (1938), Off to the North for Warmth: Queensland. The tropics at your door, David Whyte, Government Printer for the Queensland Government Tourist Bureau
- Trompf, Percy; Olympic Tyre & Rubber Co (1935), Olympic tyres : Australian champions, [Ballarat] F.W. Niven Pty Ltd
- Trompf, Percy; Australian National Travel Association (issuing body.) (1936), Australia : million-peopled cities and a European environment!, Melbourne Australian National Travel Association
- Trompf, Percy; Australian National Travel Association (1934), St. Paul's Melbourne, Australia : Victorian and Melbourne Centenary 1934-35 commencing October, Australian National Travel Association
- Trompf, Percy; Victoria. Visual Education Centre (1930), Always wait for the green light, Visual Education Centre. Victoria Dept. of Education
- Trompf, Percy; Australian National Travel Association (1934), This will be the place for a village : Victorian and Melbourne Centenary Celebrations, Australia : season 1934-35 commencing October, Troedel & Cooper Pty Ltd for Australian National Travel Association
- Trompf, Percy; Australian National Travel Association, (issuing body.) (1931), Tropical North Queensland (April to Sept.), Australia, Australian National Travel Association
- Australian National Travel Association; Trompf, Percy, 1902-1964 (1936), Australia : the tallest trees in the British Empire - Marysville, Victoria, Australian National Travel Association
- Trompf, Percy; Australian National Travel Association (1934), World's greatest air race for MacRobertson Trophy : England to Australia, Victorian and Melbourne Centenary 1934-35 (commencing October), Australian National Travel Association
- Trompf, Percy; Victorian Government Tourist Bureau; Victorian Railways. Advertising Division (1935), Prince's Highway Tour - Melbourne To Sydney : four days - by rail and road - consult Govt. Tourist Bureau, Queen's Walk (opp. Town Hall) Melbourne, Govt. Tourist Bureau
- Trompf, Percy; Buchan Caves Committee, (issuing body.); Victorian Government Tourist Bureau (1935), The mystic beauty of the Buchan Caves, Issued by the Buchan Caves Committee
- Trompf, Percy; Victorian Railways (issuing body.); Robert Harding Pty Ltd (printer.) (1935), Days of freedom : go down to the seaside by train, Victorian Railways, Australia
- Trompf, Percy; Victoria. Apple Campaign Committee; Victorian Railways (1930), Keep fit, eat more apples : remember - an apple a day -, Apple Campaign Committee, Dept. of Agriculture & Railways Dept
- Roughley, T. C. (Theodore Cleveland); Trompf, Percy, 1902-1964; Australian National Travel Association (1937), Big-game angling Australia, ANTA

=== 1940s ===
- Trompf, Percy; Australian National Travel Association (1940), Western Australia, W.A. Government Tourist Bureau
- Trompf, Percy; Trans-Australian Railway (1940), To Western Australia by Trans-Australian Railway, Trans-Australian Railway
- Trompf, Percy; Blue Mountains (N.S.W.). Council (1946), See for yourself ... : Blue Mountain Resorts - N.S.W, [Katoomba?] [Blue Mountains County Council?]

=== 1950s ===
- Trompf, Percy; Queensland Government Tourist Bureau (1950), North Queensland calls you : to a winter holiday in the tropics, Queensland Government Tourist Bureau
- Trompf, Percy; Queensland Government Tourist Bureau (1950), A winter holiday in the sun! : Brisbane river city of the north, Queensland Government Tourist Bureau
- Trompf, Percy; Victoria. Department of Education. Visual Education Centre (1950), Always avoid cycling more than two abreast !
- Trompf, Percy; Victoria. Department of Education. Visual Education Centre (1950), Never walk in groups on country roads !
- Trompf, Percy; Ebeli, Gerard, 1928-2009, (artist.) (1951), Across Australia in air-conditioned comfort by the Trans-Australian Railway, Issued by the Commonwealth Railways Commissioner
- Trompf, Percy; Victoria. Department of Education. Visual Education Centre (1950), Look both ways before stepping on to the road
- Trompf, Percy; Victoria. Department of Education. Visual Education Centre (1950), Always join or leave a tram correctly!
- Trompf, Percy; Victoria. Department of Education. Visual Education Centre (1950), Always try to understand drivers' signals
- Trompf, Percy (1950), 3 vital words, made in Australia : for value - wherever you trade, buy Australian made
- Trompf, Percy; Victoria. Department of Education. Visual Education Centre (1950), Always play in a safe place not on the road
- Trompf, Percy; Queensland Government Tourist Bureau (1950), A winter holiday in the sun! : Brisbane river city of the north, Queensland Government Tourist Bureau
- Trompf, Percy; Commonwealth Railways (Australia) (1959), Winter tours to Central Australia
- Trompf, Percy; Commonwealth Railways (Australia) (1959), Winter holidays by rail to Central Australia
- Trompf, Percy; Queensland Government Tourist Bureau (1950), Visit colourful Queensland, Queensland Government Tourist Bureau
- Trompf, Percy; Queensland Government Tourist Bureau (1940), Off to the North for warmth, Queensland Government Tourist Bureau
- Trompf, Percy, 1902-1964, (book designer.); Turnbull, Lyle, 1928-2003, (author.); Australian Publicity Council (1954), Under southern skies : Victoria, Australia, Australian Publicity Council

=== Posthumous ===
- Trompf, Percy; Australian National Gallery (issuing body.) (1989), Canberra : apply New South Wales Railway booking offices, for travel and holiday particulars, [Canberra] Australian National Gallery
- Trompf, Percy, 1902-1964; Commonwealth Railways (Australia) (1994), See the heart of the continent : winter holidays by rail to central Australia [poster]

== Exhibitions ==
- 2017, 14 July – 15 October; Brave new world, National Gallery of Victoria
- 2012/13, 12 December – 7 July; Treasures Gallery, National Library of Australia, 12 December 2012 – 7 July 2013
- 2008, 5 March – 15 June; Bridging the Distance, National Library of Australia
- 2007/8, 13 December – 17 February; Pioneers of the Inland: Australia's Muslim Cameleers 1860s - 1930s, National Library of Australia
- 2003/04, 22 October - March; Tourism in Australia: an exhibition of material from the Monash University Library Rare Books Collection, Sir Louis Matheson Library, Monash University
- 2001, 10 August – 22 October; All the rage: the poster in Victoria 1850-2000, Keith Murdoch Gallery, State Library of Victoria
- 1999/2000, November - March; Follow the Sun, National Library of Australia

== Collections ==
- Art Gallery of New South Wales
- National Gallery of Australia
- National Library of Australia
- National Museum of Australia
- Australian National Maritime Museum

== Awards ==
- 1929: winner, Orient Company's first prize of £30 for a design in the annual industrial poster competition organised by the Royal Society of Arts
- 1934: Ideal Label Contest
- 1946: First prize (£100) in the Blue Mountains Council's nation-wide competition
