= Australian Songwriters Association =

Australian Songwriters Association

The Australian Songwriters Association (ASA) was founded in Melbourne in 1979 by Tom Louch and Rudy Brandsma. It is the only national, all genre songwriters association in Australia.

== History of the Australian Songwriters Association ==
Tom Louch called the first meeting of songwriters in Melbourne on 22 July 1979, which brought together a group of Melbourne-based songwriters interested in forming an organisation to represent their interests. The first published ASA membership list appeared in December 1979 and comprised the names of 21 people including Tom Louch and Rudy Brandsma. Tom Louch (1932-2009) was the first president of the ASA. As a songwriter, he was known for his composition “On The Gold Coast”. The song was prompted by a call from the Mayor of the Gold Coast in Queensland, Keith Hunt, who determined that the city needed an anthem to encourage tourists after devastating floods caused by Cyclone Wanda in 1974. The song was recorded by American entertainer Lovelace Watkins, who had been appointed “Ambassador at Large” by the Gold Coast Mayor, and released in Australia in 1980.

Rudy Brandsma (1944–1983) was an Australian songwriter, musician, recording engineer, and producer. He worked primarily at Sound Source Studios in Box Hill, Melbourne. Brandsma, who co-wrote many songs with Richard Trembath including the song "Paleface Adios" - see List of Australian sports songs - was an audio engineer and producer on many recordings, and was associated with Bullet Records, Trend Records/Astor, and other Melbourne-based independent labels.

The ASA adopted its current National Constitution in July 2005, formally setting out its national structure, membership, regional organisation and governance. It has a national organisation together with regional representation, reflecting the broad membership of the ASA across Australia. Denny Burgess has been Chairman of the ASA since 2003. Past presidents of the ASA include Tom Louch, Rudy Brandsma, Russell Zimmer (acting), Dominic P. Crea, Brian Henderson Ward, Kieran Roberts and Colleen Zulian.

Denny Burgess, Clare Burgess and Alan Gilmour are among key figures who have contributed to the development and growth of the ASA over the last twenty years. Denny Burgess was awarded a Medal of the Order of Australia (OAM) by the Australian Government in 2024 for his service to the performing arts, and the music industry. Alan Gilmour has been Vice Chairman of the ASA and editor of The Australian Songwriter since 2010. He has been a Director of the ASA since 2006, and member and volunteer since 1996. Gilmour has also served as the Association’s Treasurer and a judge of the annual ASA Songwriting Awards. In 2025, Alan Gilmour was awarded a Medal of the Order of Australia (OAM) by the Australian Government for service to the performing arts, and the music industry.

== The Australian Songwriter Magazine ==
The ASA publishes The Australian Songwriter Magazine. The first edition of the magazine (previously known as the Songwriters’ Association Newsletter) was published in December 1979 with Vyt Karazija as the editor. Current and past issues of The Australian Songwriter Magazine are accessible via the ASA website.

== ASA Annual Awards and the Rudy Brandsma Award for Songwriting Excellence ==
The ASA’s annual songwriting awards have been held since 1980, shortly after the Association was founded in July 1979, except for interruptions due to Covid. The Rudy Brandsma Award for Songwriting Excellence, which was established in memory of the late ASA Chairman Rudy Brandsma, is presented annually by the Board of Directors of the ASA in recognition of songwriting excellence by an ASA member in the course of the current year. Notable winners of the Rudy Brand Award for Songwriting Excellence include the first winner of The Rudy Brandsma Award in 1985 Steve Wade of The Little River Band, and Michael Waugh in 1997.

== The Australian Songwriters Hall of Fame ==
The Australian Songwriters Hall of Fame was established by the ASA in 2004 to honour the lifetime achievements of Australia’s notable songwriters. Songwriters to have accepted the award include the first winners of the award in 2004, Harry Vanda, George Young and Stevie Wright of The Easybeats, the first woman inducted into the Australian Songwriters Association Hall of Fame Kate Ceberano in 2014, and Joe Camilleri and Nick Smith of The Black Sorrows in 2024.
