= Australia Week =

Celebration of Australia in the United States

Australia Week is a promotion of "all things Australian" held annually in the United States.

== History ==
Australia Week began as G'Day LA in 2004, organised by the Australian Consul General in Los Angeles, John Olsen.

=== Innovation ===
One of the days during the week is named Innovation Day, intended to provide Australian companies visibility to American venture capitalists. The marquee session of the Innovation Day includes the "Innovation Shootout" whereby six Australian states compete to have their product/innovation funded and launched in the US marketplace.

The Tasmanian company Autech Software & Design, which produces colour visualisation software, won the inaugural Innovation Shootout in 2007 and was selected as Australia's most innovative company by a panel of judges including the Wall Street Journal and CEOs of some of American venture capital firms. The company received media coverage both in Australia and overseas, including articles in the New York Post and Wall Street Journal, and the company CEO was interviewed on Chinese television. Fermiscan, the winner of the 2008 innovation competition, also received media coverage on Fox Business Network, BusinessWeek Magazine, ABC News NY and CW 11 New York.

=== Tourism ===
Qantas bookings rose during Australia Week 2008 to record-breaking levels. As a result of the promotion, in April 2008, Qantas increased its capacity to offer 47 flights between United States and Australia – nearly doubling capacity over the last five years since the promotion began.

== Media coverage ==
Australia Week 2008 media coverage generated 445 million global audience impressions—an equivalent advertising buy of approximately $7.5 million.

The Black Tie Galas in Los Angeles and New York serve as the publicity anchors of G’DAY USA: Australia Week. The dinners honor high-profile individuals for significant contributions in their industries and for excellence in promoting Australia in the United States. Previous honorees include: Cate Blanchett, Anthony LaPaglia, Mel Gibson, Nicole Kidman, Keith Urban, Olivia Newton-John, Naomi Watts, Russell Crowe, INXS, Kylie Minogue, and Phillip Noyce.

In 2011, The Black Tie Gala signature event honoured legendary British-born Australian singer Barry Gibb, tennis champion Roy Emerson and acclaimed actress Abbie Cornish. Olivia Newton-John presented to Barry Gibb, Andre Agassi presented to Roy Emerson and Director Zack Snyder presented to Abbie Cornish. The evening featured Australian food prepared by celebrity chefs Curtis Stone and Wolfgang Puck. Entertainment included performances by Guy Sebastian, The Qantas Choir and a fashion show presented by Myer.

== See also ==
- Tourism Australia
- Tourism in Australia
- Australia–United States relations
