= Mojo (advertising) =

1979–2016 Australian marketing agency

Publicis Mojo
- Type: Subsidiary
- Industry: Advertising agency
- Founded: 1979; 47 years ago
- Founders: Alan Morris; Allan Johnston
- Defunct: 2016
- Fate: Name discontinued
- Parent: Publicis Groupe

Mojo was an Australian advertising agency formed in Sydney by Alan Morris ("Mo") and Allan Johnston ("Jo") in 1979. Its lineage can today be traced to the Australian offices of Publicis, an Australian subsidiary of the French multinational advertising and communications company holding Publicis Groupe. Those offices traded as Publicis Mojo from the late 1990s until 2016.

== Founding and style ==
Johnston, initially from Adelaide and Morris from Sydney teamed up in the mid 70s at Sydney agency Hertz Walpole. Johnston had been employed there since 1968 and Morris was freelancing. Johnston and Morris had immediate success together working on campaigns for Hertz Walpole clients Meadow Lea margarine ("You oughta be congratulated") and Tooheys beer ("How do you feel?") and they left the agency but continued to work on such clients as they grew their own consultancy which they named Mojo. In 1979 their creative consultancy became a full-service advertising agency and Meadow Lea and Tooheys amongst other clients, signed with the new shop.

During the 1980s, MoJo was the hottest creative agency in Sydney and Mo and Jo had success jointly authoring World Series Cricket's "C'mon Aussie C'mon" and later the Australian Tourism Commission's spot with Paul Hogan's instruction to "put another shrimp on the barbie".

The Mojo approach to TV advertisements used a colloquial and irreverent style, often with a catchy jingle to simple accompaniment and frequently sung in Jo's own "gravelly" voice. Contrasting against the clipped and British-imitating style of voice presenters on Australian TV up till that point, Mojo ads highlighted Australian idiom and accent. Ads such as "I'm as Australian as Ampol", "Hit 'em with the Old Pea Beu" (insecticide), "Everybody loves Speedo", "I Can Feel a Fourex Coming on", "Every Amco tells a Story" (for Amco jeans) all came out of the Mojo agency in the 1980s.

== Corporate evolution ==
The firm merged with publicly listed Melbourne agency Monaghan Dayman Adams and became MojoMDA. The firm was named International Advertising Agency of the Year by Advertising Age in 1988.

In 1989 MojoMDA Ltd was Australia's largest ad agency with billings of $180 million and was acquired by the Los Angeles agency Chiat\Day. The merger was unsuccessful and in 1992 Chiat/Day sold off Mojo to Foote, Cone & Belding. The Mojo name was carried on till 2016 in the Brisbane, Sydney and Melbourne offices of Publicis Mojo, Australian subsidiaries of the French multinational advertising and communications company holding Publicis Groupe.

== Notable campaigns ==
- Put another Shrimp on the barbie promoting travel to Australia for the Australian Tourism Commission
- C'mon Aussie, C'mon promoting World Series Cricket for the Nine Network
- I feel like a Tooheys
- I Still Call Australia Home to promote Qantas
- You ought to be congratulated to promote Meadow Lea margarine - resulting from a search for a rhyme with "polyunsaturated"
- I Got It Made to promote Subway restaurants in Australia and New Zealand - promoting healthy food choices

== Discography ==
=== Singles ===
List of singles, with selected chart positions
Title	Year	Peak chart positions
Title	Year	AUS
"C'mon Aussie C'mon"	1978	1
"C'mon Aussie C'mon" (The New Era)	1979	10
