= Australian Songwriters Hall of Fame =

The Australian Songwriters Association Hall of Fame
- Country: Australia
- First award: 2004
- Website: https://www.asai.org.au/hall-of-fame/

The Australian Songwriters Association Hall of Fame was established in 2004 to honor the lifetime achievements of some of Australia's greatest songwriters. The award is presented annually at the Australian Songwriters Association Awards night by Glenn A Baker.

== List of inductees ==
Year	Inductees
2004	Harry Vanda, George Young and Stevie Wright (The Easybeats)
2005	Russell Morris
2006	Glenn Shorrock, Beeb Birtles and Graeham Goble (Little River Band)
2007	Brian Cadd (The Groop, Axiom, Flying Burrito Brothers and solo)
2008	Doc Neeson, Rick Brewster and John Brewster (The Angels)
2009	Ross Wilson (Daddy Cool, Mondo Rock and solo)
2010	Richard Clapton
2011	Steve Kilbey (The Church)
2012	Don Walker (Cold Chisel and solo)
2013	Garth Porter (Sherbet)
2014	Kate Ceberano
2015	Johnny Young
2016	Andrew Farriss and the late Michael Hutchence (INXS)
2017	The Waifs
2018	Iva Davies (Icehouse)
2019	Andrew Greedy Smith and Martin Plaza (Mental As Anything)
2020	Colin Hay (Men At Work)
2021	Terry Britten
2022	Barry Gibb, Maurice Gibb and Robin Gibb
2023	Dave Faulkner
2024	Joe Camilleri and Nick Smith (The Black Sorrows)
2025	John Farrar, Rob Hirst & Jim Moginie
