= So where the bloody hell are you? =

2006 Tourism Australia advertising campaign

End of the So where the bloody hell are you? television commercial, featuring model Lara Bingle on Fingal Bay with Fingal Island in the background

So where the bloody hell are you? was a A$180 million advertising campaign launched by Tourism Australia in 2006. It was created by the Sydney office of advertising agency M&C Saatchi, under the approval of Scott Morrison (the future Prime Minister of Australia), who was then managing director of Tourism Australia.

The advertisements featured Australians preparing for visitors to their country. It begins in an Outback pub with the barkeeper saying, "We've poured you a beer". Further imagery to a similar effect is then shown, including a young boy on the beach saying, "We've got the sharks out of the pool," and partygoers watching fireworks on the Sydney harbour, who say "We've turned on the lights". The commercial ends with bikini-clad model Lara Bingle at Fingal Bay stepping out of the ocean and asking, "So where the bloody hell are you?"

The campaign received extensive press coverage both in Australia and overseas, particularly after it was banned in the United Kingdom. It enjoyed a mixed reception, being praised for its provocativeness and memorability but also being criticised as inappropriate for a tourism campaign. It was pulled from the air in 2008.

== Bans due to perceived controversial language ==
The advertising campaign caused controversy in March 2007 when it was banned by the Broadcast Advertising Clearance Centre in the United Kingdom, which would not allow the word "bloody" in television versions of the commercial. Following lobbying by Tourism Australia, including a visit to the UK by Australia's tourism minister Fran Bailey and Lara Bingle, the ban was lifted, although a 9pm watershed was imposed on television commercials in May.

In March 2007, the Advertising Standards Authority in the UK ordered the removal of roadside billboards bearing the slogan. The ASA stated that it had received 32 complaints and warned Tourism Australia to refrain from using profanity in future billboards. Tourism minister Fran Bailey responded:

What an absolutely, incredibly ludicrous stance and a greater example of double standards you'd never find. Everyone is shaking their heads, especially as it's in a country where they allow the FCUK billboards. ... I mean what is it about our campaign that they find offensive? I just don't understand it.

The advertisement has also been banned by regulators in Canada, owing to the implication of "unbranded alcohol consumption" by the opening line, "We've poured you a beer". There was also concern in Canada at the word hell being used as an expletive. It has been allowed to run with no adverse action in countries such as the United States and New Zealand. In Singapore, the advertisement campaign is presented as "So Where Are You?", with the words bloody hell removed.

== Parodies and influences ==
Tony Blair, delivering a keynote speech during a visit to Canberra, said his first thought on arrival in Australia was "Where the bloody hell am I?"

Australian comedy writer Dan Ilic produced and released a parody of the ad towards the end of March 2006. The parody uses the structure of the Tourism Australia ad to make satirical reference to current political controversies that might concern potential tourists. The parody was the subject of controversy when Ilic removed the ad from his company's website because Tourism Australia's lawyers had threatened legal action claiming the music "was infringing their copyright". According to Ilic, however, Downwind Media "commissioned [their] own song that is different in tune and tempo", As of 28 March 2006, four "new special edition versions" of the parody were made available for download.

The Chaser's War on Everything released a similar version in their third episode with the slogan "So get your fucking arse over here!" to parody a perceived Australian propensity for vulgarity, and later took to the streets to see what tourists thought of similar campaigns which made extensive use of swearing.

In New Zealand, the TVNZ series Facelift parodied Australia's treatment of turban-wearing people ("we've kicked out all the dirty towelheads") and Aboriginal people ("we've sent the cops up north to steal their grog and porn mags") ending with the question "so if you're not a wog or a chink or some other dirty towelhead, where the bloody hell are you?" The Coromandel region also released a parody with the words, "We're bloody well in the Coromandel."

In the aftermath of the 2008 Summer Olympics, British tabloid newspaper The Sun advertised posters aimed at Australians and asking "Where the bloody hell were you?" in reference to the number of gold medals Great Britain won in comparison to Australia.

=== Ashes version ===
An advertisement was produced to promote the Nine Network's television coverage of the 2006–07 Ashes series, in the style of this ad but on a cricketing theme (e.g., '"We've rolled the ground, we've put in the stumps"). The next sentence parodied the beer quote from the original ad but this time referencing the supposed English predilection for warm beer ("we've warmed up the beer"), then "we've hidden the sunscreen, and we've brought you some soap", and finally Australian captain Ricky Ponting descending the steps of a cricket ground stating, "And we've been waiting all year."

This ad also culminates in a bikini-clad Bingle asking "So where the bloody hell are you?" on the Sydney Cricket Ground, holding a cricket bat and wearing nothing but a green and gold bikini, white shoes, and leg pads. A coda is then provided by Richie Benaud saying "Marvellous".

== Effectiveness of the campaign ==
On 6 December 2006, News Limited newspapers around Australia drew attention to the campaign's shortcomings. The A$180 million campaign had hoped to attract visitors to Australia from Japan, Germany and the United Kingdom, but tourist figures show that during October 2006 the number of Japanese tourists visiting Australia fell by 5.7% in comparison with the same period in 2005. German tourists were down 4.7% and UK visitors dropped 2.3%, although there was a slight increase in tourists from the United States and also the People's Republic of China (where the advertisement was not screened). Critics argue that the expensive campaign failed to deliver the promised increase in tourist numbers, with then opposition tourism spokesperson Martin Ferguson saying "We've been told it was a huge success and generated all these hits on a website but the latest tourism figures show the numbers are down."

In March 2007 The Age newspaper credited the ad with a $1.8 billion increase in tourism spending, and Tourism Australia stated that the primary goal of the campaign was to attract higher-spending, longer-staying visitors, not just to increase tourist numbers. After calling the ads "great" at the time of their launch when he was in Opposition, Prime Minister Kevin Rudd subsequently stated: "That campaign, every place I have visited in the world, has been basically described as an absolute rolled gold disaster."

== See also ==
- Shrimp on the barbie – another often-quoted Australian tourism slogan
- Tourism in Australia
