= Nuttelex =

Nuttelex Food Products Pty Ltd
- Type: Privately held company
- Industry: Food industry
- Founded: 1932
- Founder: Hugh Halpin
- Headquarters: Knoxfield, Victoria, Australia
- Key people: Ian G. McNally (Managing Director)
- Products: Margarine
- Website: nuttelex.com

Nuttelex is an Australian manufacturer of margarine. First manufactured in 1932, its namesake brand is the oldest brand of margarine in Australia.

== History ==
The Nuttelex company was founded in Melbourne in 1932 by Hugh Halpin.

In 1941, Gordon McNally and Ted Mayes formed a partnership and acquired the Nuttelex business. However, after a disagreement in 1947, the partnership dissolved, and Mayes left to start the Meadow Lea margarine brand.

In early times, the biggest obstacle for Nuttelex was the clout of Australia's dairy industry, which had enormous political persuasion. The 1893 Margarine Act of Victoria prohibited margarine from having a similar colour to butter. In 1936, a law was introduced mandating that margarine be saffron colour to distinguish it from butter. Quotas were introduced in the 1930s to limit the amount of margarine that could be produced, in order to protect the butter industry.

Gordon McNally was known to visit politicians to lobby for an increase in the margarine quotas. However, he only managed to get the quotas increased marginally. It wasn't until 1990 that the last margarine quota was abolished in Victoria.

In the early 1990s, Gordon McNally caused a stir after taking out newspaper advertisements complaining that the supermarket chains Coles and Safeway had increased the retail price of Nuttelex when the wholesale price had not changed. The advertisements directed customers to buy their Nuttelex at Franklins or Jewel instead (which had not raised their prices). The management of Coles and Safeway quickly dropped the price, but were said to be furious at McNally's public rebuke.

After Gordon McNally's death in 1996, aged 91, his son Ian G. McNally took over the company. By 2006, Nuttelex was manufacturing 3500 tonnes of margarine every year, and held 8% of the Australian margarine market. It also exports to Southeast Asia.

== Products ==
Nuttelex makes margarines for the niche requirements of the health conscious, those with allergies, religious dietary requirements, vegetarians and vegans. Its margarines are made without animal products or genetically modified ingredients.

The original Nuttelex used to contain nuts, and the packaging carried a logo featuring a squirrel. However, nuts are no longer used in the product, and the squirrel logo has been phased out.
