= Tourism in Australia =

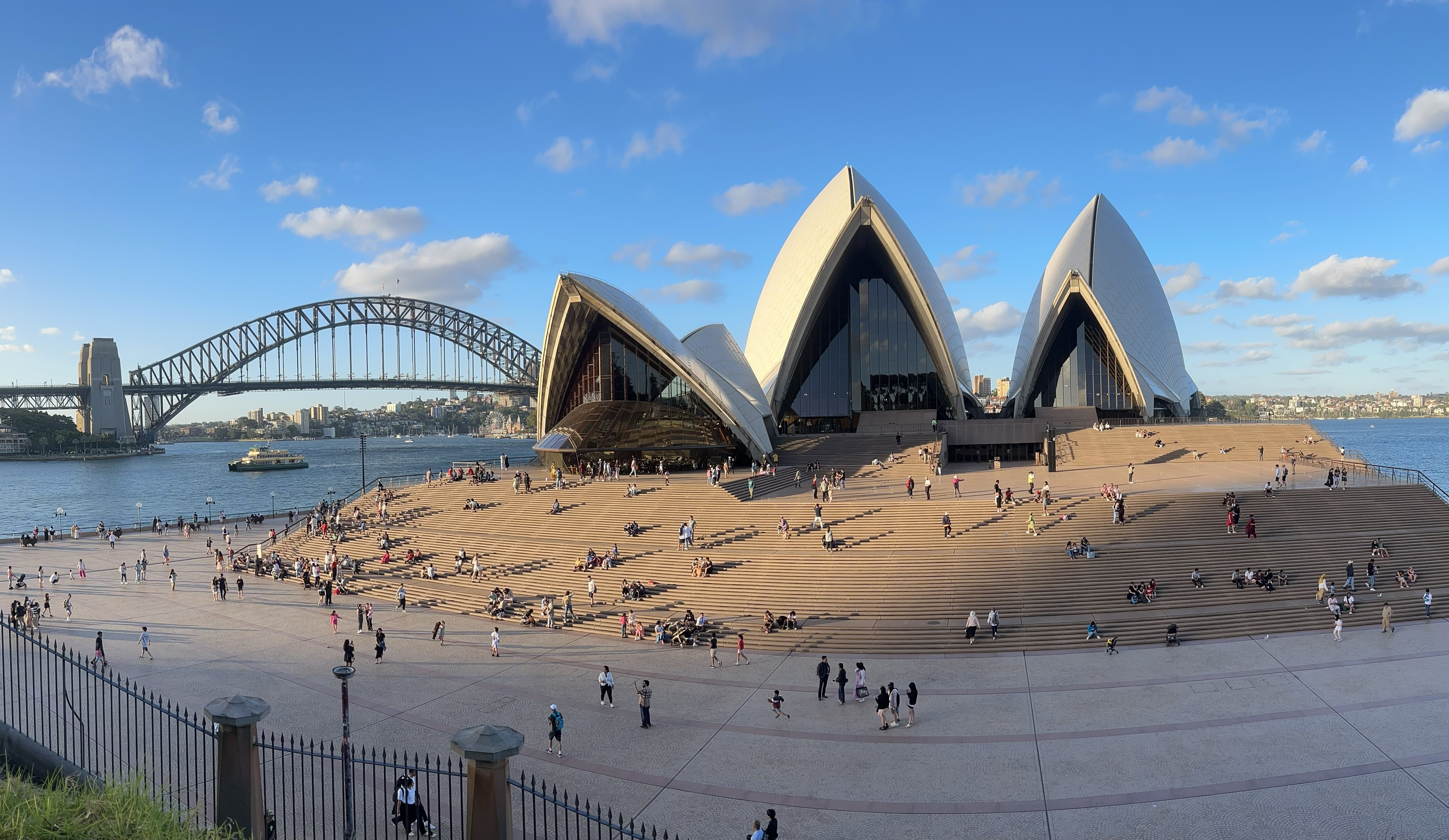
The Sydney Opera House and Harbour Bridge, Australia's most recognised landmarks which are also a key part of Sydney's status as the most popular destination in the country

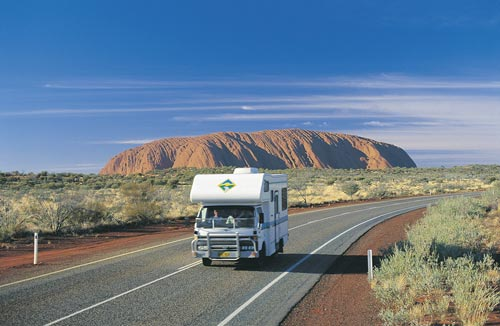
Driving on the Lasseter Highway near the Uluṟu-Kata Tjuṯa National Park, a UNESCO World Heritage Site that highlights Australia's Aboriginal population

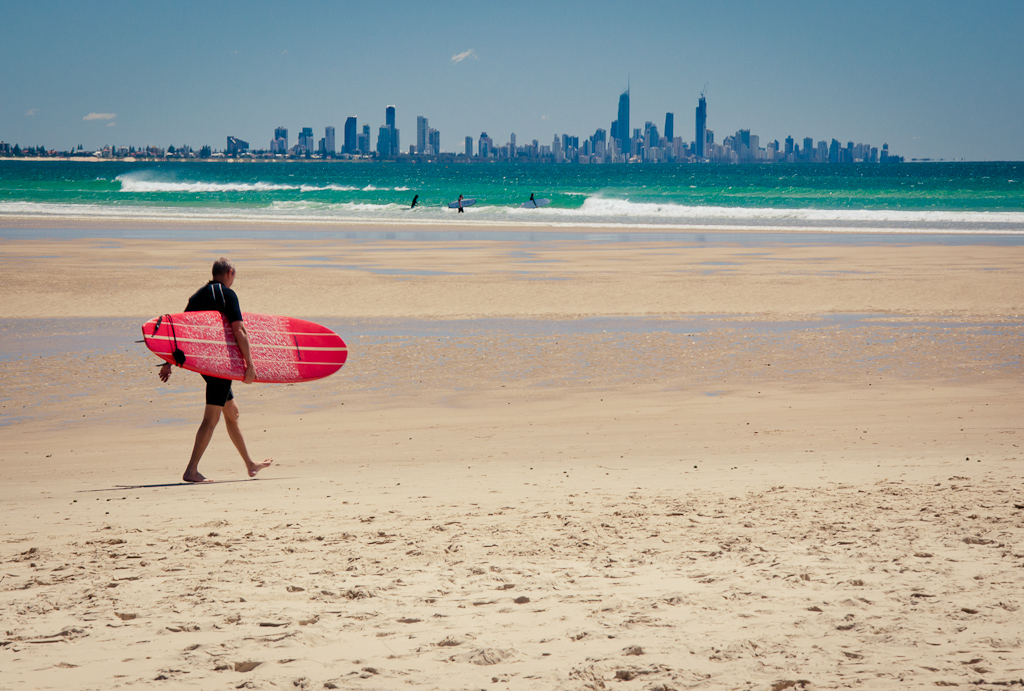
A surfer on the Gold Coast, Queensland. An iconic global image of Australian tourism focuses on its beaches, which are an integral part of the Australian identity.

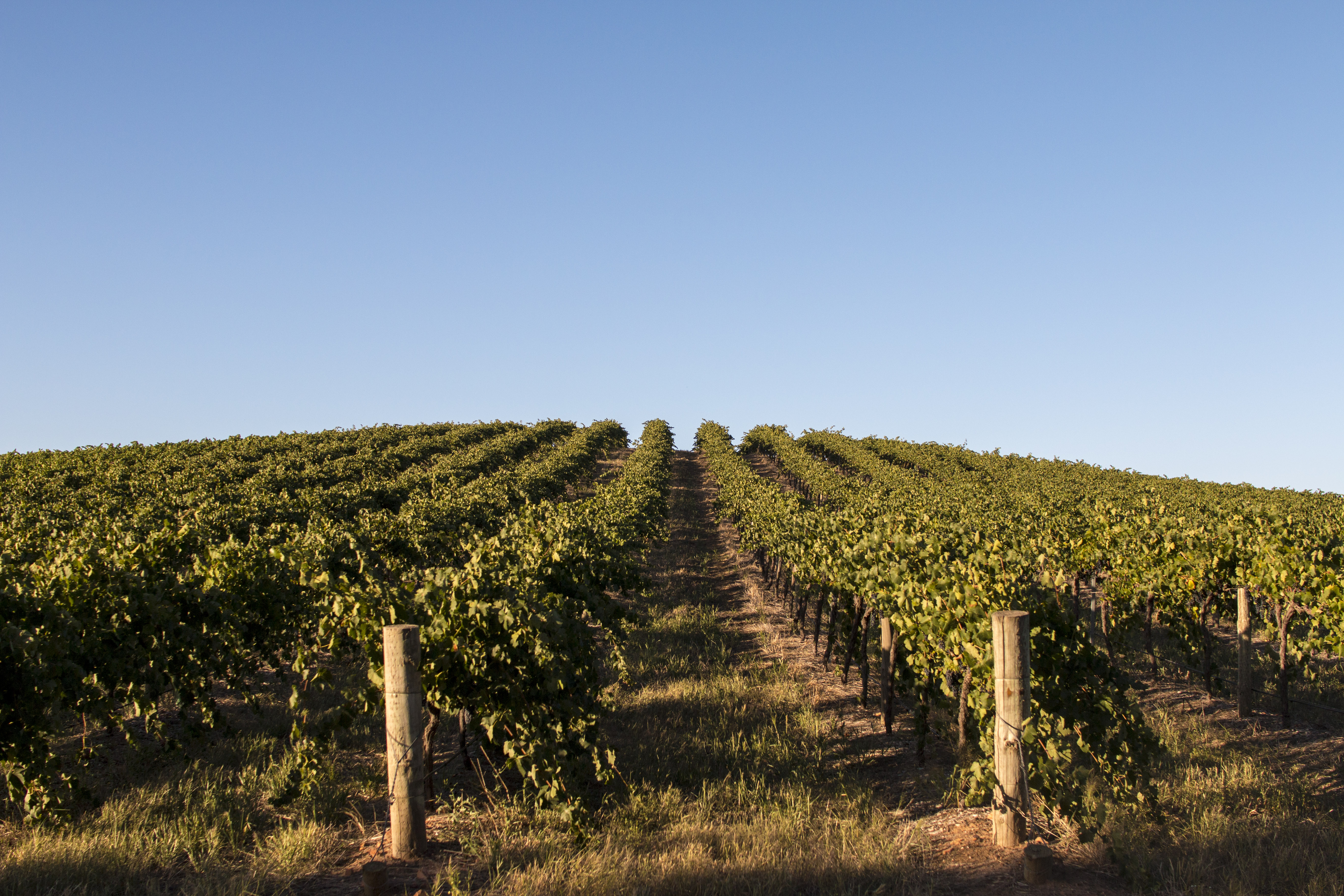
Wine vineyards on the Barossa Valley, South Australia, showcasing the country's relevance and popularity in viticulture and agriculture

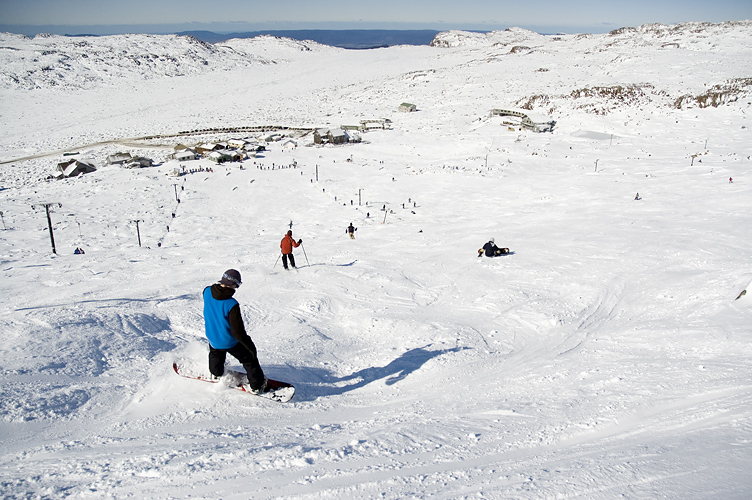
Ski ranges in Tasmania, displaying the various climates and views across the country

Tourism in Australia is an important part of the Australian economy, and comprises domestic and international visitors. Australia is the fortieth most visited country in the world according to the World Tourism Organization. In the financial year 2018/19, tourism was Australia's fourth-largest export and over the previous decade was growing faster than national GDP growth. At the time it represented 3.1% of Australia's GDP contributing A$60.8 billion to the national economy.

In the calendar year up to December 2019, there were 8.7 million international visitors in Australia. Tourism employed 666,000 people in Australia in 2018–19, 1 in 21 jobs across the workforce. About 48% of people employed in tourism were full-time and 54% female. Tourism also contributed 8.2% of Australia's total export earnings in 2018–19.

Popular Australian destinations mainly include the coastal capital cities of Sydney and Melbourne, as well as other high-profile destinations including the other coastal cities of Brisbane, Perth, Adelaide, Gold Coast, and the Great Barrier Reef, the world's largest reef. Other popular locations include Uluru, the Australian outback, and the Tasmanian wilderness. The unique Australian wildlife is also another significant point of interest in the country's tourism.

== History ==
From the colonial days, the idea of travel has been more natural to Australians than to people long-established at one from their homes, was prone to continue their search for wealth or security for a while, or, having settled down, to return to the old countries to visit their kin and refresh old memories. The opening of new lands, the establishment of industries and towns, and the consequent dispersal of people over Australia created a habit of mobility and enterprise which encouraged Australians to face the hardships of early travel by coach, on horseback or by ship. Even so, the slow and uncomfortable modes of travel and the vast distances separating Australian towns tended to restrict travel to essential journeys for purposes of trade, to pursue an occupation or to settle. This changed somewhat with the advent of rail travel.

The initial emphasis in tourism for purposes of pleasure was strongest on travel to resorts near the main population centres. These included the Blue Mountains in New South Wales and the hill and coast resorts close to Melbourne and other major Victorian cities. The existing railway services radiating from those cities, together with the 'feeder' horse-drawn, and later motor, coach transport connecting with the railways, rendered the State Government railway tourist bureaux the main means for selling intrastate, and even some interstate, travel.

Travel for all purposes increased steadily after the Second World War. This period saw the establishment of the Australian National Travel Association with bureaux in the UK and USA. The organisation received government funding on top of industry contributions and promoted the country 'vigorously' via a poster campaign, and from 1934 to 1974 via Walkabout magazine. From August 1946, Walkabout also doubled as the official journal of the newly formed Australian Geographical Society (AGS), founded with a £5,000 grant from ANTA, its banner subscript reading 'Journal of the Australian Geographical Society. This role is now filled by Australian Geographic magazine. Later it became ‘Australia's Way of Life Magazine’ when supported by the Australian National Publicity Association and later the Australian Tourist Commission.

Tourism traffic continued to be mainly by rail, but also by sea, although the family motor era began in the 1930s to participate in the shorter intrastate traffic. A considerable fleet of passenger ships like those of State Shipping Service of Western Australia and the Adelaide Steamship Company provided frequent and popular services linking all ports around the country. Other services linked Sydney and Melbourne with Tasmanian ports with some still operating ferry services to this day. The winter cruise of those days to Queensland ports could be regarded as the equivalent of today's drive or flight north for a winter holiday at the Gold Coast or a Barrier Reef Island, or today's shorter South Pacific cruises. The first cruises from Australia to New Zealand were organised in the summer of 1934–35, and Australians were travelling to Britain for as low as $78 in tourist class in the years immediately preceding the Second World War.

In the period following the Second World War the advent of new and improved methods of transportation, combined with rising standards of living and the energetic publicising of foreign destinations, developed international travel into a mass movement. New ocean liners shortened travelling time considerably, and travel by car and bus increased in many countries. Most of all, air travel became widely available, faster, safer, and cheaper. The beginning of the Jet Age in 1960, with larger aeroplanes carrying more than 100 passengers at speeds approximating 600 miles per hour, diminished the world by half in terms of time. Rising standards of living in the post-war period led to greater expenditure on tourism, thus making it more important to the national economy.

Australia has shared in this worldwide expansion of travel, particularly in respect of its domestic tourism. Because of the marked increase in incomes and private car ownership among large sections of the population, greater leisure time, three weeks of paid annual holidays (introduced first in New South Wales in 1958) and the introduction of long-service leave, thousands of Australians now travel by road into almost every part of the country. This has led to investment in the development of new and improved facilities, especially accommodation, of new resorts at dispersed points around Australia, and modifications in organisation and methods of tourist administration, development and promotion. These activities, in turn, have had an important influence on matters such as the improvement of highways and the opening up of national parks and foreshores.

A White Paper was produced analysing the tourist industry in Australia in 2003. A Tourism 2020 strategy was produced and implemented.

Prior to COVID-19 pandemic and Deltacron hybrid variant, domestic tourism in Australia continues to be a significant part of the tourism industry, representing 73% of the total direct tourism GDP and has taken on an even greater role. However, in 2021 during the pandemic, Australians travelled intrastate and also interstate when borders were open. From November 2021, borders for Australia were opened and fully vaccinated Australians were permitted to fly overseas without exemption, although the range of countries was added to Malaysia, Singapore, New Zealand, and other countries including Japan in December allowed to enter the country, from 1 December 2021. Following the significant consultation on the replacement Tourism 2030 strategy, its launch was interrupted by COVID-19 leading to the Government Commissioning an Expert Panel led by the former Tourism Minister Martin Ferguson to provide recommendations.

Eventually, an updated Tourism 2030 document titled THRIVE (The Re-Imagined Visitor Economy) 2030 strategy was finalised and published in March 2022. The document was updated to reflect the new Government's initiatives and policy priorities as well as industry actions and State and Territory support statements and launched on 17 March 2023.

== Statistics ==
Yearly tourist arrivals in millions

Despite the global economic challenges and natural disasters in 2010–2011, Australia's tourism growth was supported by increased consumption (up 4.4% over the last few years, largely due to an increase in the number of international visitors). On the back of a strong Australian dollar, 2010–11 also saw a record 7.4 million short-term resident departures from Australia, an increase of 9.9% from 2009 to 2010. Consumption by domestic tourists grew at less than half the pace of international tourists in 2010–11 (up 2.1% compared to 4.4%).

=== International tourists ===
The Australian Government released the 2020 Tourism Industry Potential on 15 November 2010, which estimated the Australian tourism industry to be worth up to $140 billion in overnight expenditure. This growth will largely be due to key emerging markets, including China, which is estimated to be the largest economic contributor to Australian tourism by 2020. The number of Chinese visitors has more than doubled from 2006 to 2012 reaching a peak of 626,400 in 2012 and surpassing for the first time the number of arrivals from the United Kingdom. In 2013, China was Australia's fastest growing tourist market. By 2017 China surpassed New Zealand as the top source of visitors to Australia, and in 2019 Chinese visitors reached a peak of over 1.4 million and had contributed about A$12 billion to the Australian economy. According to Tourism Australia Managing Director Andrew McEvoy, the Chinese are the highest spending visitors to the country.

Country	8/2024	2023	2022	2021	2020	2019
New Zealand	886,460	1,272,140	697,190	96,840	242,400	1,433,800
China	630,390	535,790	84,570	6,490	207,700	1,438,700
United States	458,690	659,740	325,630	16,670	188,700	818,000
United Kingdom	376,910	596,880	397,920	21,810	200,800	715,800
India	285,410	395,560	297,970	12,900	84,000	399,300
Singapore	266,130	364,010	295,270	15,830	58,300	478,500
Japan	258,570	297,720	79,090	1,860	91,700	498,600
South Korea	247,280	288,010	72,090	2,060	53,500	280,500
Indonesia	150,090	201,500	90,170	2,770	34,400	221,700
Hong Kong	146,100	183,700	53,110	3,100	60,900	315,200
Malaysia	132,180	175,550	84,690	2,370	44,800	384,900
Taiwan	120,890	122,790	25,750	490	36,000	194,600
Vietnam	120,640	166,630	68,900	1,280	28,500	123,500
The Philippines	115,270	157,570	79,860	4,460	26,500	158,600
Canada	103,520	157,190	87,680	3,300	52,300	189,600
Germany	98,860	151,870	85,100	3,100	53,000	207,100
France	78,130	114,160	60,030	2,960	34,700	143,700
Thailand	65,960	96,710	52,170	1,390	15,100	102,700
Ireland	52,150	79,190	45,660	1,880	17,100	67,300
Italy	39,520	62,300	35,930	1,760	15,000	75,200
Fiji	32,460	55,040	28,010	1,130	8,600	45,700
The Netherlands	30,610	51,920	31,350	1,650	15,300	64,800
Sri Lanka	30,040	41,300	27,310	1,660	8,600	44,000
Brazil	28,990	48,350	29,240	650	13,100	58,000
Spain	28,120	42,160	23,640	1,030	11,200	47,500
Papua New Guinea	28,010	39,940	20,750	1,160	9,300	49,400
South Africa	26,360	46,110	36,170	820	11,200	61,300
United Arab Emirates	26,290	37,090	23,330	2,790	7,200	40,400
Switzerland	25,040	42,600	22,570	1,190	13,300	54,700
Chile	17,090	23,840	10,920	160	7,700	29,600
Colombia	16,820	39,570	21,670	170	5,900	21,800
Denmark	16,290	26,000	14,800	590	8,800	29,700
Argentina	15,890	22,920	11,810	330	6,900	23,800
Pakistan	15,670	25,660	17,720	1,130	5,900	20,900
Sweden	15,300	28,110	17,300	820	11,500	42,600
Bangladesh	14,700	20,630	13,880	650	4,500	20,300
Norway	12,160	17,990	10,940	480	5,800	23,400
Belgium	10,790	17,190	10,610	470	5,800	23,600
Austria	10,440	16,150	8,560	410	4,800	19,500
Poland	10,230	14,890	7,790	520	6,400	21,100
Mexico	8,980	12,250	5,700	130	3,000	13,300
Israel	8,030	13,930	9,700	810	3,800	16,300
Saudi Arabia	7,230	9,430	5,850	610	4,400	14,500
Finland	6,480	11,140	6,100	260	4,000	16,400
Russia	5,960	10,630	5,010	470	5,100	17,900
Iran	5,560	11,480	8,830	390	1,900	10,600
Total	5,322,180	7,187,440	3,669,250	245,760	1,827,700	9,465,900
Source: Australian Bureau of Statistics						

In 2019, the majority of international visitors to Australia were from China, New Zealand, the United States and the UK, with visitors from China growing substantially from the early 2000s.

Growth in tourism in 2019 was led by education and holiday travel. Education visitors were up 5% to 586,000, with spending increasing by 8% to a record $12.7 billion. Holiday visitors were up 4% to almost 4 million, with spending growing by 6% to $16.9 billion.

=== Markets ===
Country / Region	Description
Australia (Domestic)	For the year ended 31 December 2009, the total economic value of domestic tourism measured $63.3 billion, with 66.1 million overnight trips taken in Australia by Australian residents aged 15 years and over.
United States	There was $2.126 billion in total expenditure from the United States in 2010. The tourism industry potential estimates that the United States market has the potential to grow to between $4.530 billion and $5.519 billion in total expenditure by 2020.
Canada	Canada was Australia's twelfth largest inbound market for total expenditure in 2010, with $700 million spent on trips to Australia.
Argentina	Argentina is one of Tourism Australia's developing markets. Arrivals to Australia from Argentina continue to perform well, with visiting friends and relatives, holiday and education segments reporting good growth from a small base.
Brazil	46,400 tourists from Brazil visited Australia in 2014–2015, an increase in 19% from the year prior.
China	There was $3.26 billion in total expenditure from the China market in 2010. The tourism industry potential estimates that China has the potential to grow to between $7.406 billion and $9.022 billion in total expenditure by 2020.
India	There was $0.826 billion in total expenditure from the Indian market in 2010. In 2019 the expenditure was $1.8 billion, up 68%. The tourism industry potential estimates that India has the potential to grow to between $1.854 billion and $2.258 billion in total expenditure by 2020.
Hong Kong	Hong Kong was Australia's eleventh largest inbound market for total expenditure in 2010, with $0.808 billion spent on trips to Australia.
Indonesia	Indonesia was Australia's thirteenth largest inbound market for total expenditure in 2010, with $0.608 billion spent on trips to Australia.
South Korea	There was $1.279 billion in total expenditure from South Korea in 2010. The tourism industry potential estimates that the South Korean market has the potential to grow to between $2.792 billion and $3.401 billion in total expenditure by 2020.
Malaysia	There was $1.047 billion in total expenditure from Malaysia in 2010. The tourism industry potential estimates that the Malaysian market has the potential to grow to between $2.046 billion and $2.492 billion in total expenditure by 2020.
Taiwan	Tourists from Taiwan increased to 121,400 in the year ending April 2015, an increase of 9.1% from the previous year. The total inbound economic value of the Taiwan market increased by 21 per cent to $398 million.
Singapore	There was $1.199 billion in total expenditure from Singapore in 2010. The tourism industry potential estimates that the Singapore market has the potential to grow to between $2.266 billion and $2.760 billion in total expenditure by 2020.
Thailand	Thailand is ranked 15th among Australia's source markets in terms of arrivals. Australia received a total of 77,500 visitors from Thailand in 2008/09, a decrease of 8 per cent compared to the previous year.
Vietnam	There were 37,246 arrivals from Vietnam in the calendar year 2010, an increase of seven per cent on the previous year.
United Kingdom	There was $3.184 billion in total expenditure from the United Kingdom in 2010. The tourism industry potential estimates that the United Kingdom market has the potential to grow to between $5.479 billion and $6.675 billion in total expenditure by 2020.
Netherlands	The total inbound economic value of the Netherlands market was $300 million in 2008/09 which was a three per cent increase in the previous year.
Germany	There was $0.910 billion in total expenditure from Germany in 2010. The tourism industry potential estimates that Germany has the potential to grow to between $1.902 billion and $2.316 billion in total expenditure by 2020.
Switzerland	Australia received a total of 53,600 visitors from Switzerland in 2014/2015. The total inbound economic value was $270 million which was one per cent less than the previous year.
France	There was $0.561 billion in total expenditure from France in 2010. The tourism industry potential estimates that the France market has the potential to grow to between $1.153 billion and $1.405 billion in total expenditure by 2020.
Nordic	The total inbound economic value of the Nordic market increased by 5 per cent during 2008/2009 and was valued at $506 million. Australia received a total of 58,700 visitors from the Nordic region in 2008/09.
Ireland	Australia received a total of 64,420 visitors from Ireland in 2008/09, a decrease of 1 per cent compared to the previous year. The total inbound economic value increased 3 per cent to A$479 million in 2008/09.
Spain	Despite a strong increase in October visitor arrivals, total arrivals year to date (YTD) continue to be well below last year and Spain continues to be one of the hardest-hit European markets.
Italy	There were 73,200 visitor arrivals from Italy in 2014–2015.

=== Domestic tourism ===
The domestic tourism market is estimated at $63 billion. In 2009, the Australian domestic market experienced a 10% slump in the number of visitor nights. Domestic tourism in general and in particular free caravan and camping sites for overnight accommodation experienced strong demand in 2012.

Australians are domestic travellers, with a profusion of seaside resort towns in every state (many located on or near good surfing beaches), mountain retreats, plentiful national parks, rivers, fishing locations, wine growing regions, as well as domestic visitation of the major tourist spots. Domestic tourism peaks during the Australian school holidays.

In 2011, a leading Australian travel agent warned that low-cost carriers such as AirAsia and Jetstar who offered cheap packages to Asia threatened the domestic tourism market.

== Visas ==
All visitors to Australia, apart from New Zealanders, require an Australian visa to enter the country. For most countries, a full visa is required. Passport holders of all European Union countries as well as all Schengen Area countries and European microstates can apply online for an eVisitor authorisation. Citizens of some OECD and some East Asian countries can apply for the similar Electronic Travel Authority authorisation.

== Organizations ==
The Australian Trade and Investment Commission has tourism policy and programs responsibility in the Australian Government with Tourism Australia responsible for marketing Australia. State and territory government jurisdictions have tourism policy departments and/or tourism marketing authorities along with regional tourism organisations. The industry has a wide range of stakeholder bodies including the Australian Tourism Industry Council (ATIC), which includes promotion of the Quality Tourism Framework, the Australian Tourism Awards and Star Ratings Australia; the Australian Chamber of Commerce and Industry Tourism Chamber, and the Australian Tourism Export Council (ATEC).

=== Marketing ===
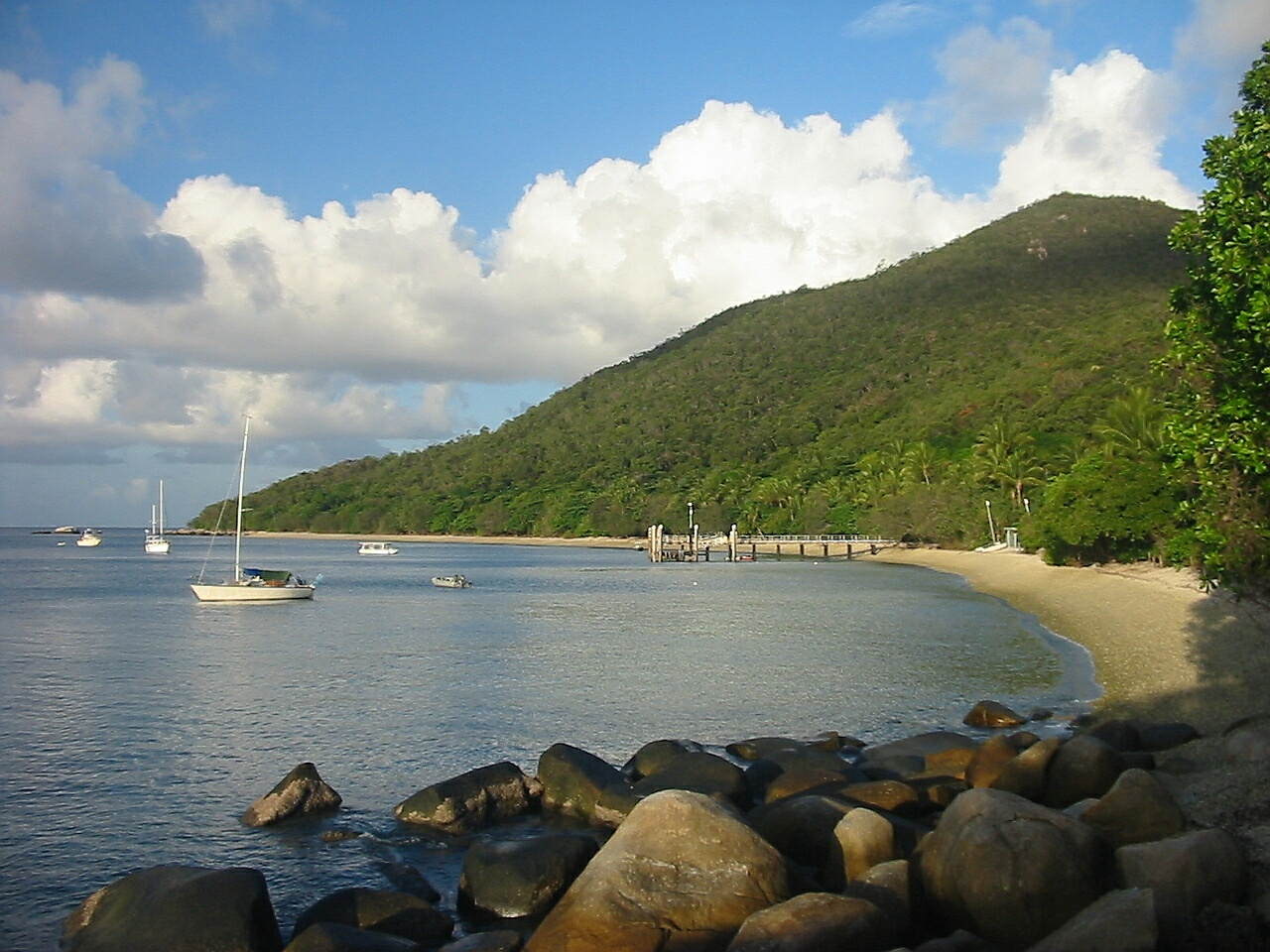
Fitzroy Island, Queensland

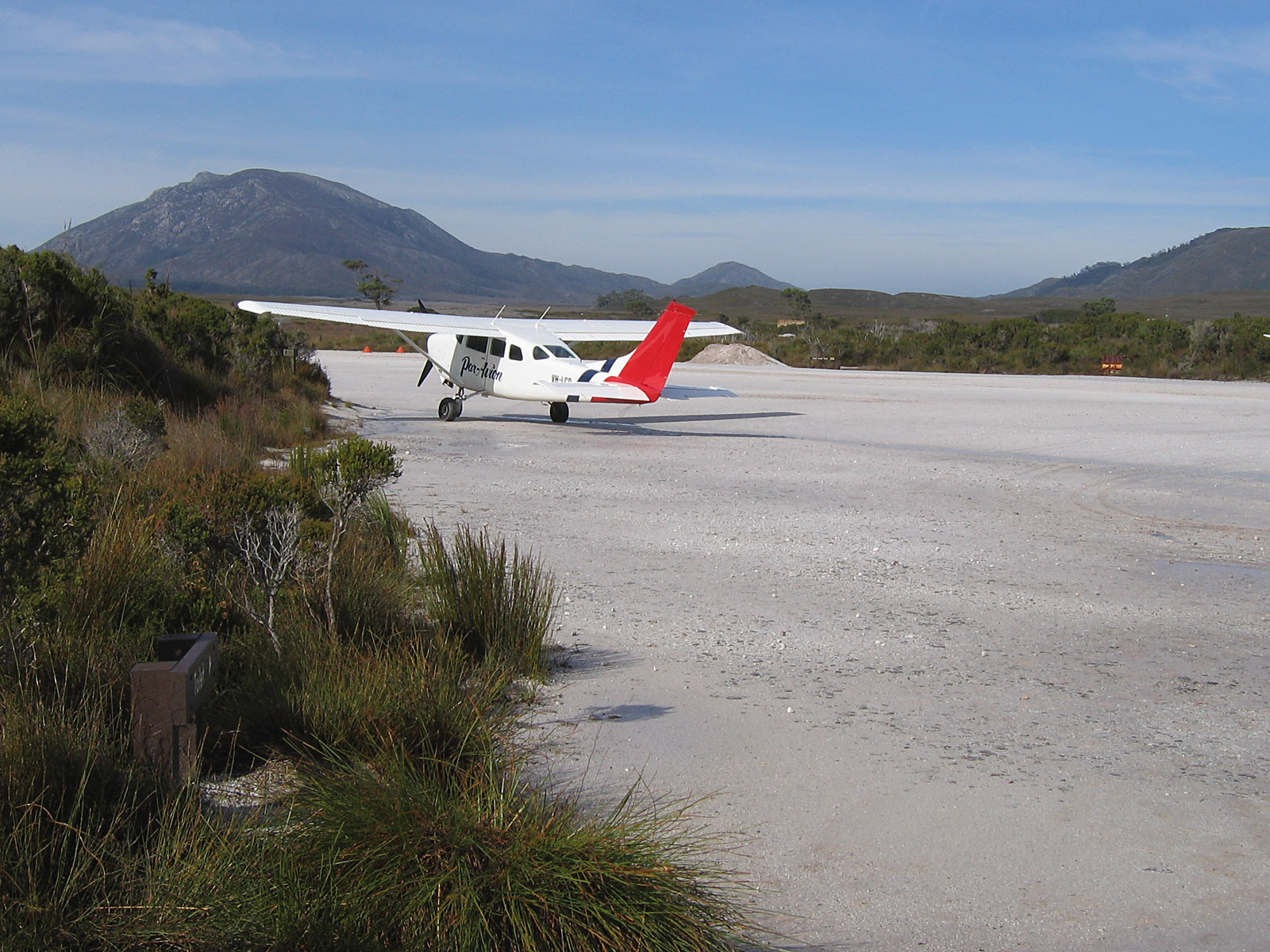
A tourist plane prepares for take-off from the Melaleuca Airstrip in the South West Wilderness of Tasmania

Australia's international tourism campaigns have focused on Australia's laid back style, such as the 1980s advertising campaign featuring actor Paul Hogan telling American tourists "I'll slip an extra shrimp on the barbie for you", or its cheeky side, as in its controversial 2006 campaign in the United Kingdom using the Australian colloquialism slogan "So where the bloody hell are you?".

Tourism Australia's "No Leave No Life" campaign was launched in March 2009 by the Federal Minister for Tourism, the Hon. Martin Ferguson AM MP. This campaign was designed to remind employees of the personal and professional benefits of taking annual leave, and of taking that leave in Australia. On 30 June 2009, there were 126 million days of stockpiled annual leave in the Australian economy. At the end of the June 2010 quarter, this number had decreased to 117 million days, following falls in the preceding three quarters.

Tourism Australia's consumer campaign "There's Nothing Like Australia" invited Australians to share their favourite Australian place or experience with the world. The campaign is based on research conducted by Tourism Australia that showed Australians were eager to get involved in promoting their country. It was developed to involve Australians because they are the experts on what makes Australia unlike anywhere else. The core message, that "There's Nothing Like Australia" was designed for longevity through different mediums, audiences and activities.

== Types of tourism ==
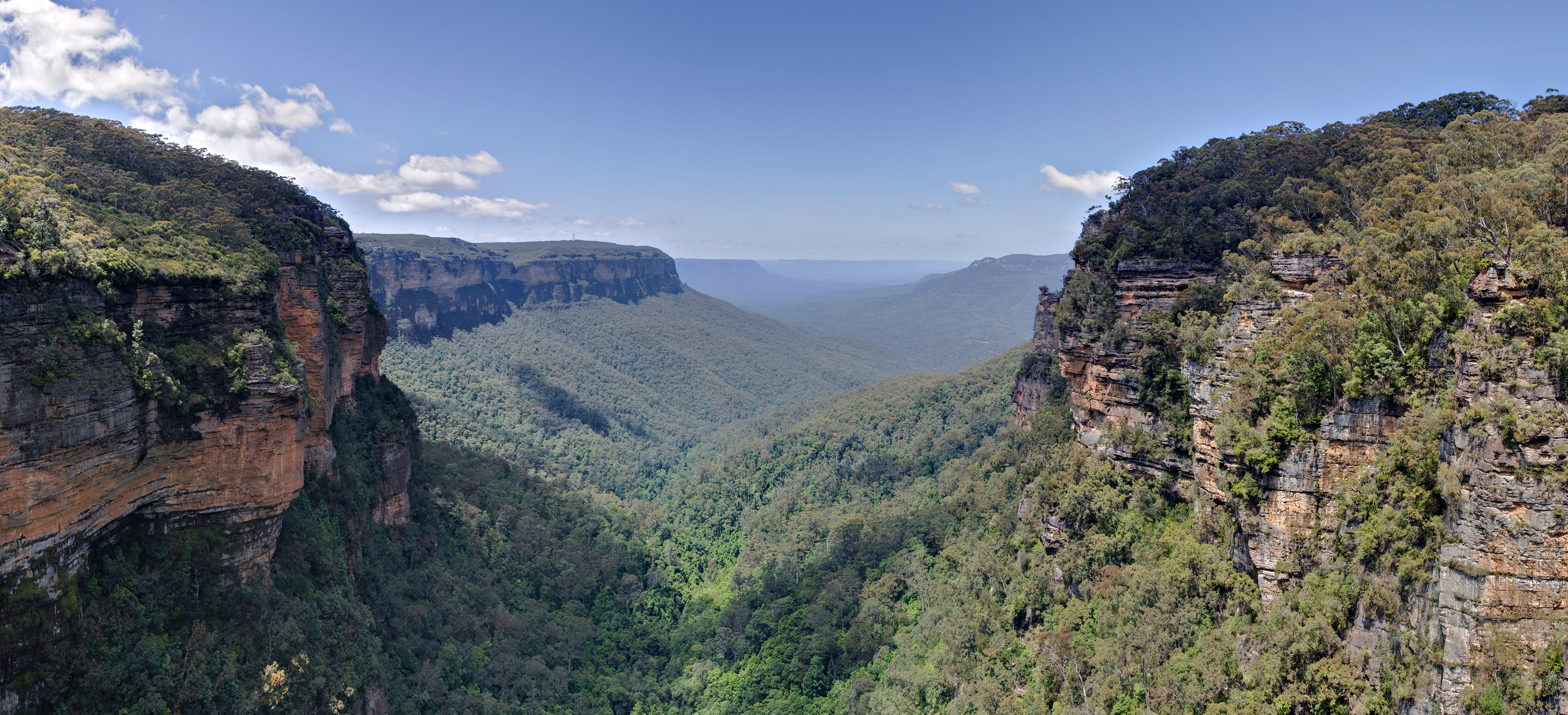
Jamison Valley in the Blue Mountains

=== Backpacking ===
Australia is popular for people engaging in backpacker tourism. Spending more time in Australia, these travellers tend to explore considerably more of the country. Many backpackers participate in working holidays enabling them to stay longer in the country. Working holiday visas for Australia are available for those aged 18 to 30 for most citizens from Western Europe, Canada, the United States, and some developed East Asian nations such as Hong Kong, Taiwan, Japan and South Korea. More than 111,000 of these visas were issued between July and December 2022, compared to 23,000 over the same period in 2021. This brings them back in line with pre-pandemic levels. As a result of this, hostel revenue is projected to grow by 7.9% in the 2023–24 financial year.

=== Birdwatching ===
According to Tourism Research Australia, international visitors spent $2.6 billion on travel that involved birdwatching in 2024. Some visitors travel long distances and spend thousands of dollars chasing a glimpse of rare birds.

=== Ecotourism ===
Australia has a diverse geography, containing many distinct geographical features and unique fauna. Ecotourism accounts for a large portion of Australia's domestic and international tourism, with two thirds of all international visitors in 2016 having engaged in nature tourism in some way. Popular activities include skiing, surfing, hiking, camping and whale watching.

Whale watching is available seasonally on almost all of Australia's subtropical coast. Boat tours are usually offered in coastal towns, although whales can be easily viewed from the shoreline. Whale watching hubs include Hervey Bay, Eden and Bateman's Bay.

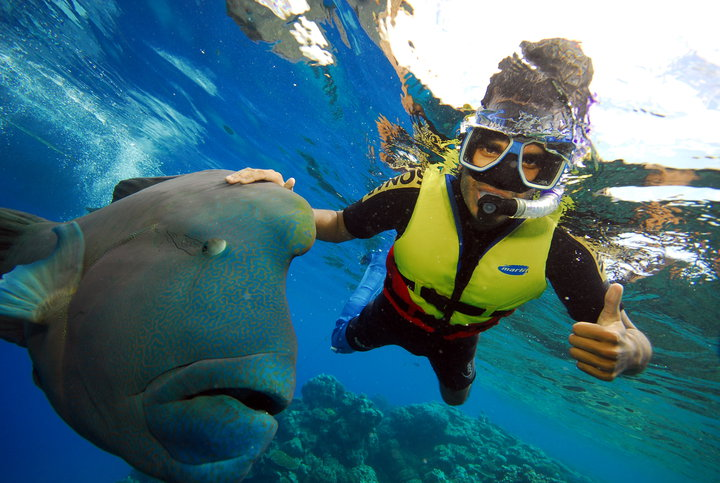
Snorkelling on the Great Barrier Reef, 2011

=== Arts and cultural tourism ===
Many tourists that visit Australia engage with cultural tourism, including some 54% of international tourists and 26% of domestic tourists in 2015. Cultural tourism is most significant in Australia's urban areas, however most towns will offer some sort of heritage tourism.

=== Events ===
Year-round, Australia has many events, which attract both domestic and international tourists.

The 2000 Sydney Olympics resulted in significant inbound and domestic tourism to Sydney. During the games, Sydney hosted 362,000 domestic and 110,000 international visitors. In addition, up to 4 billion people watched the games worldwide. The 2003 Rugby World Cup attracted over 65,000 international visitors to Australia, having also taken place in Sydney.

Additionally, the Australian Grand Prix is one of the most attended racing events in the country, with the 1995 Australian Grand Prix in Adelaide holding the record for the most attended race weekend in the history of the championship, attracting over 520,000 people.

Schoolies Week is an annual celebration of Year 12 school leavers in late November, with the Gold Coast maintaining its status as one of the most attended venues. In 2011 they were expected to boost the economy by $60 million.

The world's second largest annual Arts festival The Adelaide Fringe (only smaller than The Edinburgh Festival Fringe) welcomed 2.7 million attendees in 2019.

=== Attractions ===
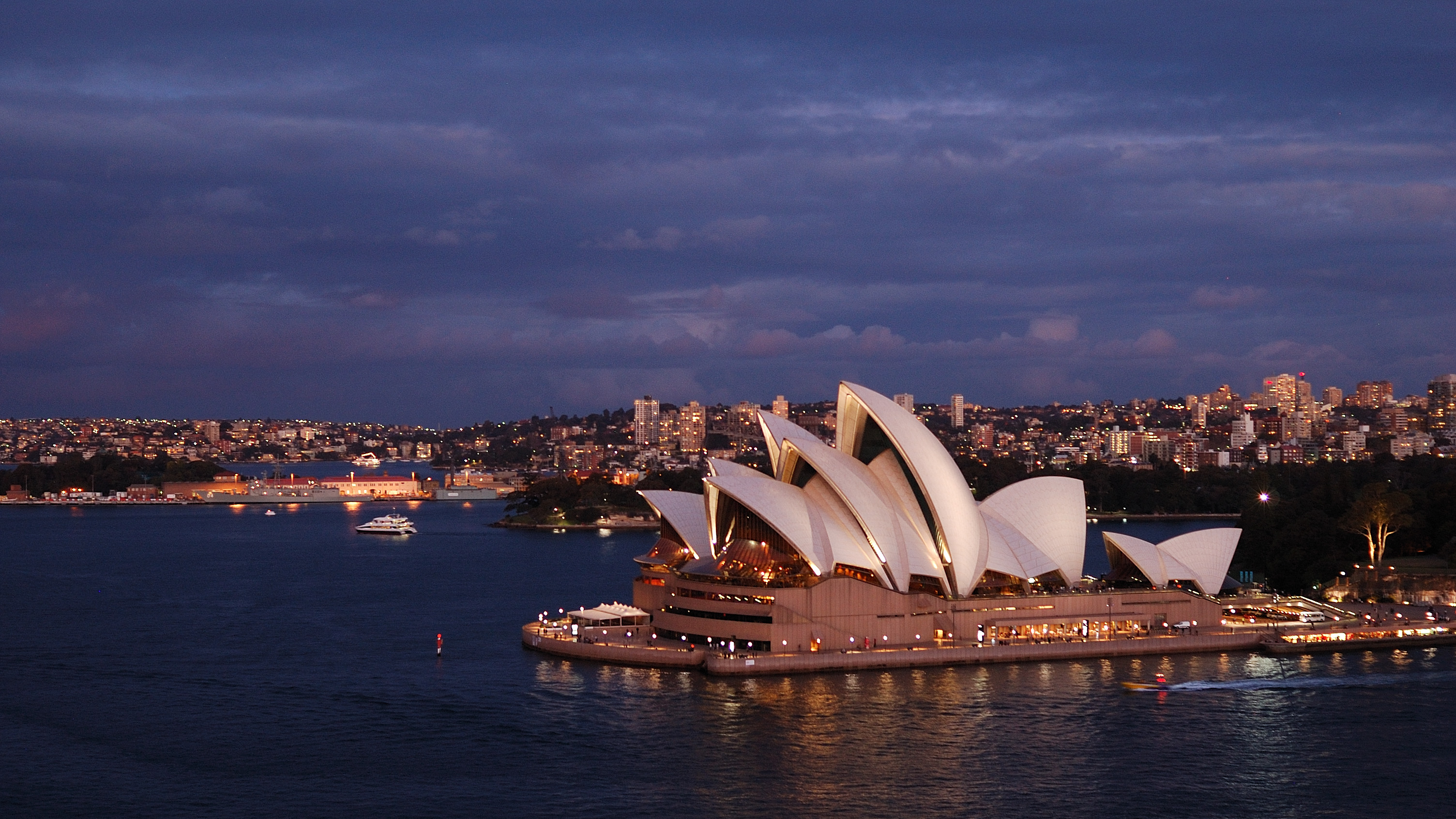
The Sydney Opera House

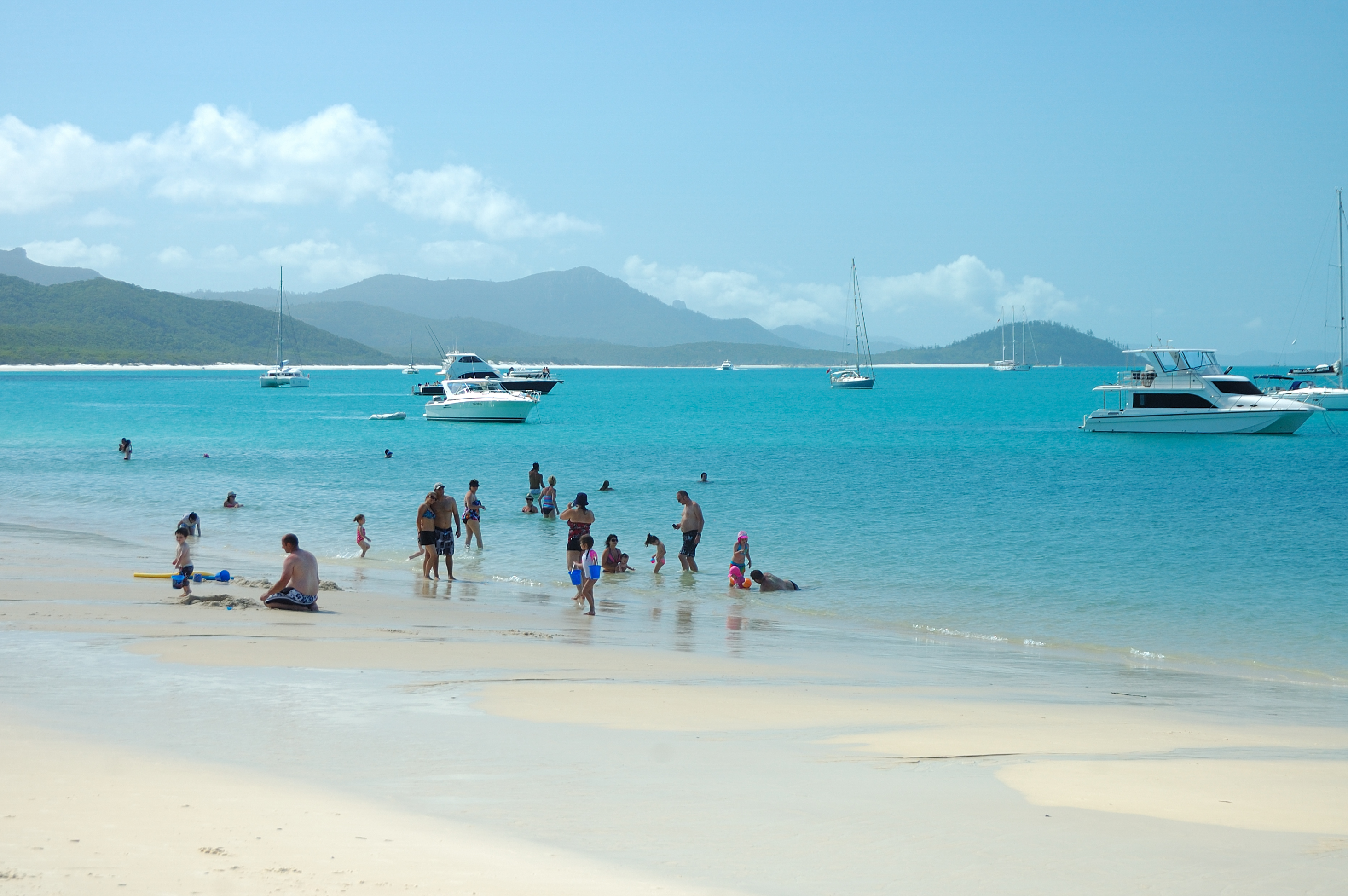
Whitehaven Beach at Whitsunday Island. Australian beaches are world renowned.

Major Australian icons for tourists to visit include:

- Great Barrier Reef
- Red Centre
- Great Ocean Road
- Barossa Valley
- Kakadu
- The Kimberley
- Kangaroo Island
- Byron Bay
- Tasmanian Wilderness
- Australian Alps
- Ningaloo
- Flinders Ranges
- Fraser Island
- Sydney Harbour Bridge
- Freycinet
- Gippsland
- Uluru
- Coober Pedy
- Sydney Opera House
- Phillip Island
- Melbourne Cricket Ground
- Blue Mountains
- Namadgi National Park

== See also ==
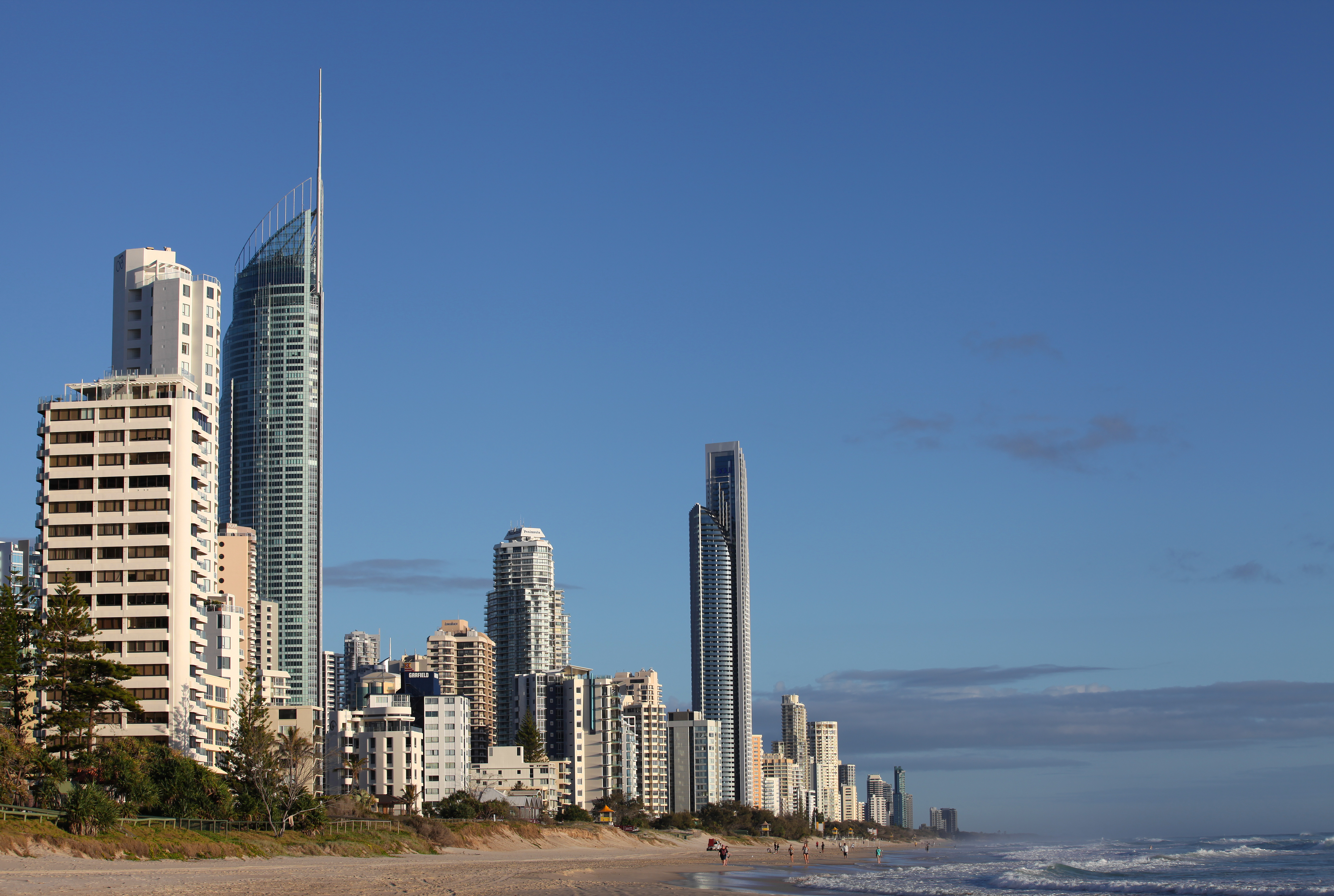
Beach of Surfers Paradise, Gold Coast

- Visa policy of Australia
- List of World Heritage Sites in Australia
- Tourism in Sydney
- Tourism in Melbourne
- Tourism in Brisbane
- Tourism in Perth
- Tourism in Adelaide
- Passenger Movement Charge
- Australian National Travel Association
