= C'mon Aussie C'mon =

1978 Australian advertising jingle

Single by Mojo singers.
- Released: 1978
- Recorded: 1978
- Genre: Advertising jingle
- Length: 2:20
- Label: WEA
- Songwriters: Allan Johnston, Alan Morris, G Koos, S Baird

"C'mon Aussie C'mon" is an iconic Australian cricket anthem.

== Origins ==
The work was written as a 60-second jingle by Allan Johnston, Alan Morris and other creative staff at the Sydney advertising agency Mojo in 1978 to promote the second season of Kerry Packer's cricket competition World Series Cricket for the Nine television network. The song eulogised players such as Dennis Lillee, the Chappell brothers Ian and Greg and Rod Marsh, used the limerick metre in its verse structure and ended with the refrain, "C'mon Aussie, c'mon, c'mon" sung again and again.

The popularity of the chorus and the success that the new cricket competition enjoyed in the 1978/79 summer season inspired the Mojo agency to recut the track and release it as a single in 1978. The jingle's double limerick was split into two, additional refrains were added and a 2' 15" version was produced for radio release and sale. Performed by the Mojo Singers (including Allan Johnston and other agency and recording studio personnel), it topped the charts in Australia for two weeks in February 1979.

The jingle continued to be used to promote World Series Cricket in subsequent seasons even after the rebel competition was reunited with the sanctioned Australian Cricket Board fixtures. The song was played at the WSC games and the chorus was sung by crowds at those games and also the official Test matches. In those subsequent advertising campaigns the lyrics would change to announce who the Australian cricket team's opponents for that summer and to highlight the latest stars of the team.

=== Track listing ===
1. "C'mon Aussie C'mon" (radio version) – The Mojo Singers
2. "Establishment Blues" (radio version) – Sidney Hill

=== Charts ===
==== Weekly charts ====
Chart (1979)	Peak position
Australia (Kent Music Report)	1

==== Year-end charts ====
Chart (1979)	Peak position
Australia (Kent Music Report)	22

== Shannon Noll version ==
"C'mon Aussie C'mon"

Single by Shannon Noll
- Released: 20 December 2004
- Recorded: 2004
- Genre: Pop
- Length: 3:28
- Label: Sony BMG
- Songwriters: Allan Johnston, Alan Morris, G Koos, S Baird
- Producer: Mark Rivett

Shannon Noll singles chronology
"Learn to Fly" (2004)	"C'mon Aussie C'mon" (2004)	"Shine" (2005)

In 2004, Australian singer Shannon Noll recorded a cover with updated lyrics. The track was released on 20 December 2004 to aid the children's charity Good Start, a joint charity set up by the Australian Red Cross and Sanitarium foods to raise money to ensure all Australian children start the day with a healthy breakfast.

=== Track listing ===
1. "C'mon Aussie C'mon" (full version)
2. "C'mon Aussie C'mon" (radio edit)

== 2019 women's team version ==
In December 2019, the jingle was reprised by Commonwealth Bank ahead of the ICC Women's T20 World Cup 2020. New lyrics about members of the Australia women's cricket team, including Beth Mooney, Meg Lanning and Ellyse Perry, were written by Hamish Stewart from advertising agency GHO Sydney and recorded by Allan Johnston, one of the original creators. Any profits from streaming or downloads went to the McGrath Foundation, the breast cancer charity founded by former Australian cricketer Glenn McGrath. The song also featured in commercials for Commonwealth Bank supporting the women's team.

== Charts ==
Chart (1979)	Peak position
Australian Kent Music Report	1
Chart (2004)	Peak position
Australian ARIA Singles Chart	2
Australian ARIA Australian Artists Singles Chart	2
Australian ARIA Singles End of Year Chart (2005)	43
