= Australian National Travel Association =

Former travel industry organisation in Australia

The Australian National Travel Association (1929–2001) was a semi-government industry organisation which promoted tourism and travel in Australia.

== Establishment ==
The Australian National Travel Association was formed in 1929 at the onset of the Great Depression by Sir Charles Lloyd Jones, merchant and patron of the arts, who became director of its board of management. Most states had already, or soon had, tourist bureau though their budgets were insufficient. Prime Minister Stanley Bruce announced the formation of the national organisation on Wednesday 1 May 1929, allocating £100,000, obtained mostly from tourist industries for Australian overseas publicity.

== Operation ==
Australia lithograph in colour, c.1929, designed by Percy Trompf

The organisation was put under the control of a committee of representatives of the principal contributing bodies, comprising Harold W. Clapp, chairman of Victorian Railway Commissioners, D. I. Dowell, representing British and foreign shipping interests, C. W. Wilson, proprietor of Scott's Hotel, Melbourne, on behalf of Australian hotels, and C. Lloyd Jones, of David Jones., Sydney, for Australia's general business interests. In addition representatives were appointed to England and America, to 'make vigorous contact with travel-selling agencies through the English-speaking world'. H. C. Fenton became its agent in Great Britain in Grand Buildings, Trafalgar Square, London, and the association's representative in U.S.A. and Canada A.H. O'Connor worked from an office in the Adam Grant Building at 114 Sansome Street, San Francisco.

In 1956 the first managing director of the Australian National Travel Association, Charles Holmes, appointed West Australian award-winning journalist Basil Atkinson to reopen the first ANTA office abroad since the war, in San Francisco, to promote Australia as a tourist destination for Americans. After a successful advertising campaign, Atkinson was recalled to be general manager of ANTA, reorganising operations and winning increased government financial support which supported the opening of an office in London, followed by offices in Wellington and New York. In order to allay perceptions of competition between the states and the national organisation Atkinson arranged for all states and two government agencies to have representation on the ANTA board.

== Marketing ==
From its inception the Association marketed creatively, first commissioning posters featuring striking images and simple slogans from Australia's leading poster designers (some now iconic, like Trompf's Bondi Beach) including Percy Trompf, James Northfield and Gert Sellheim to attract international tourists largely ignorant of Australia.

Walkabout magazine published 1934–1974 by ANTA promoted tourism and travel in Australia.

Subsequently, in 1934, the ANTA board, under acting chairman Charles Lloyd Jones, established a monthly travel magazine Walkabout which continued publication until 1974. It attracted widespread advertising support from tourism businesses and promoted aspects of Australia of which even its own citizens would have been unaware. It was assertively Australian in its ethos but took cues from other popular magazines of the period, such as the United States' National Geographic Magazine, and LIFE.

From August 1946, Walkabout also doubled as the official journal of the newly formed Australian Geographical Society (AGS), founded with a £5,000 grant from ANTA, its banner subscript reading 'Journal of the Australian Geographical Society'. This role is now filled by Australian Geographic magazine. Later it became ‘Australia's Way of Life Magazine’ when supported by the Australian National Publicity Association and later the Australian Tourist Commission.

== Reorganisation ==
An investigation of tourism was commissioned from the American firm Harris, Kerr, Forster by ANTA Managing Director Basil Atkinson. Their 345-page report, entitled Australia's Travel and Tourist Industry 1965 and known colloquially as the `HKF Report' was presented to the ANTA in September 1965. This was the first comprehensive survey of the travel and tourism industry to be carried out in Australia.

On its recommendations federal parliament passed the Australian Tourist Commission Act, resulting in the Association's major function, tourism marketing, being incorporated into a statutory authority, the Australian Tourist Commission (ATC) which provided for the promotional functions of ANTA to be taken over from July 1967, with Atkinson being appointed its first chief executive.

ANTA maintained its representation of tourism stakeholders and became the Australian Tourism Industry Association in 1985, prompted by its growing industry potential, and then was renamed the Tourism Council Australia in 1995. However, in early 2001 it was placed in receivership, to be replaced the Tourism Task Force, established under the Hawke government in the 1980s, and the Australian Tourist Commission.
