= Gert Sellheim =

German-Australian artist

Gert Sellheim (1901–1970) was a German-Australian artist. He won the Sulman Prize for his work in 1939 for his Mural Decoration on wall of Victorian Government Tourist Bureau, Hotel Australia Building, 272 Collins Street, Melbourne.

Sellheim was born in Estonia to German parents and studied architecture at universities in Germany before migrating to Western Australia in 1926. He established an architecture and design practice in Melbourne in 1930, and moved to Sydney in 1947. A significant selection of his work was exhibited in the exhibition Aboriginal Art and its Application organised by the Australian Museum, Sydney in 1941 and his design for an 'Aboriginal Art' stamp was released in Australia in 1948.

Sellheim produced posters for the Australian National Travel Association and his most renowned design is Qantas airlines' distinctive flying kangaroo logo, created in 1947.

In 2019 Gert Sellheim was inducted to the Australian Graphic Design Association Hall of Fame.
