= Shrimp on the barbie =

Australian phrase

Screenshot from the advertisement

Shrimp on the barbie
A sample of Paul Hogan's "shrimp on the barbie" Australian tourism advertising campaign.

"Shrimp on the barbie" is a phrase that originated in a series of television advertisements by the Australian Tourism Commission broadcast in the US and UK starring Paul Hogan from 1984 through to 1990. The full quote spoken by Hogan is "I'll slip an extra shrimp on the barbie for you", and the actual slogan of the ad was "Come and say G'day".

The phrase has since been used, along with some variations, to make reference to Australia in popular culture in the US. The phrase is rarely used in Australia. Few use the word "shrimp" in Australia (the word most commonly used is "prawn") and the phrase is often perceived as American.

== Production ==
While Hogan was well known in Australia from his long-running television comedy show, the advertisement pre-dated Hogan's popularity in America from the 1986 film Crocodile Dundee. However, the success of the film increased the commercial's popularity.

The advertisements were developed by the Australian agency Mojo in conjunction with American agency N. W. Ayer. The campaign was launched during the National Football Conference Championship Game on 8 January 1984. Before the campaign, Australia was approximately number 78 on the "most desired" vacation destination list for Americans, but became number 7 three months after the launch, and soon became number 1 or 2 on Americans' "dream vacation" list, remaining in that position for most of the next two decades.

"Barbie" is Australian slang for BBQ and the phrase "slip a shrimp on the barbie" often evokes images of a fun social gathering under the sun. Australians, however, invariably use the word prawn rather than shrimp. Because the commercial was commissioned for broadcast in the United States, the change was made to limit audience confusion.

== Impact ==
The commercial was so influential that three decades later, Australian USC Trojans football player Chris Tilbey reported that he was quoted the "shrimp on the barbie" line "Every day. Every day", and Jesse Mirco of Ohio State said he heard it daily.

== See also ==
- So where the bloody hell are you?
- Tourism in Australia
