= Walter Jardine =

Australian commercial artist (1884–1970)

- Born: 6 May 1884; Macdonaldtown, New South Wales, Australia
- Died: 24 February 1970 (aged 85)
- Known for: Poster; stamp designs

Walter Lacy Jardine (6 May 1884 (Note: Later sources give his birthdate as 5 May 1885) – 24 February 1970) was an Australian commercial artist, known for his draftsmanship.

== Biography ==
Jardine was born in Macdonaldtown, Sydney, the second son of Alfred Henry Jardine (died before 1913), and his wife Amy Mary Jardine, née Lacy (died 20 April 1936).

Caricature by David Low

When quite young he was apprenticed to newspaper artist J. H. Leonard, and later studied at an art school conducted by J. S. Watkins. By age 17 he was a regular contributing artist to The Australian Star newspaper.

In October 1910 The Lone Hand published his pen and ink drawing, "Tennis girl".

An example of Jardine’s scraper-board art, from an advertisement published in 1926

In 1923 he left for New York, where he become known for his detailed drawings on scraper-board, and illustrated William Randolph Hearst’s Cosmopolitan, Good Housekeeping and Motor magazines, the American Legion's magazine and other cover art and commercial work, making more money than he could ever earn in Australia.

In May 1928 he returned to Sydney, (Note: On the RMS Aorangi, which ran a regular passenger service Vancouver–Sydney. He left America due to failing eyesight, according to some.) where he was soon back at work, creating advertisements that appeared in The Bulletin, Home and other papers as well as posters. He also illustrated articles that appeared in The Bulletin.

By May 1950 he was operating an advertising agency with an office at 66 King Street, Sydney.

Over the years he produced posters advertising some of Australia's best-known brands: Akubra hats, Arnott's Biscuits, Burns Philp travel, Orient Line travel, Pelaco shirts, Qantas air travel, Royal Agricultural Society, Stamina men's wear, Tooth & Co beer, and Tooheys beer.

In 1953 Jardine supplied the cover art for the (Sydney) Carols By Candlelight programme, depicting the Three Wise Men.

On 25 July 1962 the Australian Post Office released a 5d (standard letter) stamp designed by Jardine, to commemorate the centenary of Stuart's crossing the continent. In 1964 they released a series of high-denomination postage stamps, "The Navigators", all bearing artwork by Jardine. The series consisted of 5/- William Dampier, 7/6 James Cook, 10/- Matthew Flinders, £1 George Bass, £2 Phillip Parker King. (Note: At decimalization, 5d (five pence) equaled 4.2 cents; 10/- (ten shillings) became $1.00; £1 (one pound) $2.00.)

== Publications ==
- The Art of Walter Jardine (1932).

Illustrated:

- The Coloured Conquest (1904) "Rata" (Thomas Richard Roydhouse) pub. NSW Bookstall Company

Newspaper examples:

- "The Spirited Ghost". The Sun (Sydney). 6 March 1943.
- "Souvenir of the War". Sunday Mail. No. 750. Queensland, Australia. 3 September 1944. p. 5 – via National Library of Australia.

== Family ==
On 1 June 1918 Jardine married Sylvia Mary Prior (16/12/1892 - died 1/03/1977 aged 85); they had two daughters:

- Byrl Lillian Jardine (27/03/1919 – 8/09/2015) married Keith John C. Wordsworth (18/08/1920 – 22/08/2006), on 27 September 1941.
- June Lacy Jardine (24/08/1922 – 9 May 2015) married Peter Booth-Jones (25/11/1920 - 16/08/2013) in 1943

Both men were RAAF officers during the 1938–1945 war. Wordsworth was a Flying Officer, MiD; Booth-Jones was Squadron Leader, No. 76 Squadron and awarded DFC

They had a home at Roseville, New South Wales in 1942.
