= Tourism Australia =

Australian Government tourism agency

Agency overview
- Formed: 23 June 2004; 22 years ago
- Preceding agencies: Australian National Travel Association; Australian Tourist Commission; See Australia; Bureau of Tourism Research; Tourism Forecasting Council; Tourism Council Australia
- Headquarters: Sydney
- Employees: 162
- Annual budget: $161 Million (2019–20)
- Minister responsible: Don Farrell, Minister for Trade and Tourism
- Deputy Minister responsible: Tim Ayres, Assistant Minister for Trade
- Agency executive: Phillipa Harrison, managing director
- Parent department: Department of Foreign Affairs and Trade
- Key document: Tourism Australia Act 2004
- Website: tourism.australia.com

Tourism Australia is the Australian Government agency responsible for promoting Australian locations as business and leisure travel destinations. The agency is a corporate portfolio agency of the Department of Foreign Affairs and Trade, and employs 198 staff (including 80 staff at overseas offices). It works closely with the Australian Trade and Investment Commission, the Australian Government's tourism policy and program agency, and State and Territory tourism marketing organisations.

Tourism Australia's objectives are to influence and encourage international and domestic travel to Australia, foster a sustainable tourism industry, and develop economic benefits to Australia from tourism. The agency contributes to the implementation of the THRIVE 2030 national strategy (The Re-Imagined Visitor Economy) issued in March 2022 which aims to return international and domestic spend in the visitor economy to pre-pandemic levels of $166 billion by 2024 and grow it to $230 billion by 2030. The agency is active in 15 markets, including Australia, where it aims to grow demand for the nation's tourism experiences through international and domestic promotions, advocacy and representation.

== Organisational history ==
Tourism Australia was created in 2004 by the Tourism Australia Act (Cth) as a merger of four existing tourism organisations – the Australian Tourist Commission, the Bureau of Tourism Research, and the Tourism Forecasting Council, and See Australia. Tourism Australia describes itself as the successor of the Australian Tourist Commission, and hence celebrated what would be the commission's 50-year anniversary in 2017.

In February 2019, Tourism Australia collaborated with Australian Traveller to launch a magazine in the United States, Australia. Jane Whitehead, regional general manager Americas, Tourism Australia, said "In collaborating with Australian Traveller, we set out to tell quintessentially Aussie travel stories, while highlighting some of the finest hospitality product, in a way that compels travellers to book memorable vacations."

== Campaigns ==
The organisation caused controversy in 2006 when its advertising campaign "So where the bloody hell are you?" gained media attention following a ban in the United Kingdom.

In January 2010 Tourism Australia displayed a caged kangaroo on a street in Hollywood. The kangaroo was filmed by a concerned member of the public who was reported as saying, "The kangaroo was there in a pen, like a 10 by 12 (foot) pen, straight on the concrete and it was really, really disturbing. It was just disturbing. There were kids who were really upset because this kangaroo was just rocking back and forth and back and forth and back and forth." Australian macropod expert Tim Faulkner, after viewing the video of the kangaroo, said that it was clear the animal was not acting normally, "The animal is obviously distressed, there is no question about it. The sort of stress I see here suggests that it has endured long-term problems."

In 2010, Tourism Australia launched its There's nothing like Australia campaign, sourcing its stories and photographs from the Australian public through a competition with strict licensing conditions. The terms and conditions of the competition required the authors to assign all rights, including moral rights, to Tourism Australia and indemnify Tourism Australia against any legal action as a result of its re-using the works, which the Australian Copyright Council stated were extreme conditions and "particularly disturbing given that Tourism Australia is a government body".

A 2019 advertising campaign, entitled Matesong, that featured Kylie Minogue, Ashleigh Barty, Adam Hills, Shane Warne, and Ian Thorpe, with a song written by Eddie Perfect, was aired on televisions in the United Kingdom before the Queen's message on Christmas Day. However the advertisement was withdrawn several days later in light of the impact of the 2019–20 Australian bushfires.

In October 2022, Tourism Australia launched its Come and Say G'day global campaign featuring its new brand ambassador Ruby the Roo, an animated kangaroo voiced by Rose Byrne. Don Farrell, the Minister for Trade and Tourism, said the mascot would showcase Australia's "most iconic" destinations and support the tourism industry's recovery following the COVID-19 pandemic by converting pent-up demand into bookings. The second chapter of the campaign, fronted by Robert Irwin and featuring Nigella Lawson and Yosh Yu, began launching in key international markets in August 2025.

== People ==
Scott Morrison served as managing director of Tourism Australia from 2004 until 2006, when his three-year contract was prematurely terminated. Morrison was subsequently elected as the Member for Cook in the House of Representatives and served as Treasurer until August 2018 when he assumed the role of Prime Minister of Australia.

In January 2014, Tourism Australia announced it had appointed Fox Sports' Chief Operating Officer John O'Sullivan as its managing director. In September 2019 Phillipa Harrison was appointed as O'Sullivan's successor, having been the Acting Managing Director of Tourism Australia since his departure in April 2019.

== See also ==
- Australia Week
- Shrimp on the barbie
- Tourism in Australia
