= Meadow Lea =

Australian brand of margarine food spread

Meadow Lea is one of Australia's leading brands of polyunsaturated margarine spreads, founded in Sydney in 1932 by Oliver Triggs who claimed to be the first person in Australia to manufacture table margarine, and owned since 1986 by the Australasian food company Goodman Fielder. In 1995 it had a 25% share of margarine sales, and was the top-selling margarine brand since 1973.

== History ==
Meadow Lea Margarine was founded by Oliver Triggs in early 1932, when manufactured in Edgeware Road, Newtown, Sydney. However its origins go back at least a year, when Triggs assisted a copha butter manufacturer in Melbourne (which was more affordable than pure butter during the Great Depression), while running a small grocery shop at 6 Elizabeth Street, north Richmond since the late 1920s. After copha butter was banned in Victoria in November 1931 to support the butter industry and pure butter sales, Triggs started making margarine as a replacement, and then moved to Sydney in about April 1932, which had more favourable margarine regulations, and sales of Meadow Lea grew rapidly. Shortly afterwards back in Melbourne, Nuttelex was founded by Hugh Halpin in a factory in Gordon Street, south Richmond (now part of Cremorne), where his brother James Halpin had manufactured copha butter since 1929 (and may have continued making it after the ban). Also formed in Fitzroy, Melbourne was Birmacley margarine (by Colin Birt, Leslie McMaster, George Buckley and Harriet McMaster), which became Colvan table margarine in 1956, owned by Triggs' longtime horseracing friend Ted Mayes' sons Colin and Ivan, when Triggs sold Ted the Meadow Lea Victorian manufacturing license in 1956. Later in 1932 the Meadow Lea factory was moved to 34 Wellington Street, Newtown. By March 1933 there were 70 employees working in the factory. In 1934 Triggs hired James (Jim) Andrew Armstrong as a sales manager, on commission, for country regions in New South Wales. By 1939 75% of all margarine consumed in Australia was manufactured in 10 factories in NSW. In 1941 Triggs and Armstrong reached an agreement whereby Armstrong would sell his roughly 25% sales commission share in the Meadow Lea Margarine Company to Triggs' son Ken in 1945 when he turned 21. In 1941 the factory was moved to 1 Alice Street, Newtown, leased from Sydney Confectionery Limited, with the fit-out costing £15,000.

In 1945 Armstrong sold his 25% share of Meadow Lea to Ken Triggs, and retired from the company. In 1956, Oliver and Ken Triggs sold the Meadow Lea Margarine Company (excluding the Victorian manufacturing license) to Vegetable Oils Proprietary Limited, a subsidiary of the publicly listed company Allied Mills Limited.

On 30 April 1986 Allied Mills was taken over by Fielder Gillespie Davis Limited, part of the Goodman Group Limited (New Zealand), to create Goodman Fielder Limited. In 2015 Goodman Fielder was purchased by Wilmar International and First Pacific, and in 2019 First Pacific's half share was acquired by Wilmar, one of the largest listed companies by market capitalisation on the Singapore Exchange.

== Products ==
In 2010 the MeadowLea product range consisted of six varieties:

- Original
- Salt Reduced
- Canola
- Light
- Extra Light
- Dairy Free

== Oliver Triggs ==
Oliver Francis Triggs (21 March 1895 – 28 August 1962) was born in Ascot Vale in Melbourne and grew up on a small farm. He fought with the Light Horse in World War I, then trained as a tailor. He was married in September 1922 to Nita Alice Beck (or Bek, 13 April 1895 – 16 June 1974), a seamstress, and in the late 1920s they opened a corner grocery shop. They had four children, Kenneth, Audray and Marian (non-identical twins, born 20 June 1930), and Jill. Triggs claimed to be a cousin of brothers AB Triggs and Inigo Triggs.

From August 1935 until 1975, the family home was Edgewater, 3–5 Sutherland Crescent, Darling Point, bought from George Wirth of Wirth Brothers Circus which cost £30,000, and was then-called Margworth, built for Wirth and his wife Margaret in about 1929–30 in the Spanish style. Its water front gardens (including a tennis court and swimming pool) were sold to the neighbouring Carthona in the 1950s, when Edgewater was divided into three homes (one on each floor) with Triggs retaining the top floor. Triggs also owned the cruiser Sea Mist circa 1939–41 (possibly HMAS Seamist which sank the Japanese midget submarine M-21 in the attack on Sydney Harbour in 1942, but there may have been two cruisers called Sea Mist made by Lars Halvorsen Sons in 1937-39, hence the confusion).

From 1939 to 1946 Triggs owned the approximately 2,000 acres (810 ha) Kyalla Park sheep farm and horse stud near Orange, which had the first electrified sheep-shearing shed in Australia (built in about 1910 by the previous owners, the Stuart family, builders of Luna Park Sydney). Subsequently the property was slowly subdivided and sold off by the Dutton family, so that it was around 150 acres (61 ha) when owned by the Napier family from 1982 to 2021. In 1939 Triggs' racehorse Gilltown won the Moonee Valley Cup (and again in 1940) and City Tattersall's Gold Cup, and ran in the Melbourne Cup (leading almost to the home turn). In c1960-74 Triggs' wife Nita owned 'Landers' (with c11 acres, now subdivided No. 6) in The Avenue, Burradoo, Bowral, where her granddaughters kept riding horses.

== Ken Triggs ==
Kenneth Oliver Triggs OAM (5 April 1924 – 11 July 2022), the only son of Oliver Triggs, was a director and 25% shareholder in Meadow Lea from 1945 until the company's sale to Vegetable Oils Proprietary Limited in 1956. He subsequently became a farmer and Chairman of the NSW Egg Board, a manufacturer of polystyrene containers, Chairman of Mutual Home Loans Fund of Australia Limited and Information Electronics Limited. In 2003 he became the Secretary of the Auburn sub-Branch of the Returned and Services League of Australia (RSL), and was made a life member of the RSL in 2008. He received an Order of Australia in 2011 for service to veterans and their families. He married Ruth Carol Donnison (2 August 1926 – 4 May 2023) on 4 July 1950 (best man: Colonel Rene Lemercier, bridesmaid: Wendy Playfair, friend: Pam Hornibrook) and had two sons, David (b1957) and Andrew (b1961). He built in c1960 a single storey house at 4B Wentworth Street, at the top of Point Piper, next door to horse trainer Tommy Smith, near Kilmory (Ave Maria Retreat House), which was sold in c1972 and demolished c2010. The couple divorced in c1976, and on 20 June 1986 Triggs married Lesley-Anne Woodward, who had 4 children from her previous marriage.

== Meadow Lea house ==
The Art Deco heritage listed residential home named Meadow Lea at 22 Sydney Road, East Lindfield, Sydney, was built on four housing lots and completed in about 1941 for James Andrew Armstrong, at the time co-proprietor (25%) of the Meadow-Lea Margarine Co. In 1945 the pool and grounds were used in the filming of A Son Is Born (released 1946), which included in its cast John McCallum, whose brother Ian later married Oliver Triggs' daughter Audray. The house was sold in 1948 for £17,000 to Azzalin Romano, of the nightclub restaurant Romanos, who had sold his racehorse Bernborough in 1946 to Louis B. Mayer for £93,000. In 1955 the house was sold for £25,000. In 1996 it was purchased by Daniel Kalanderian, the co-founder of the Sydney store, Victoria's Basement, for $1.415 million, who added a new wing and put it on the market in September 2010 for $7.5 million. It was for sale in 2014 for $10 million, and in 2020 the south gardens were sub-divided by Kalanderian into a 1,162sqm block with a new five-bedroom house, numbered 22A Sydney Road, which was for sale in April 2022 for $8.5 million as never-been-lived-in.

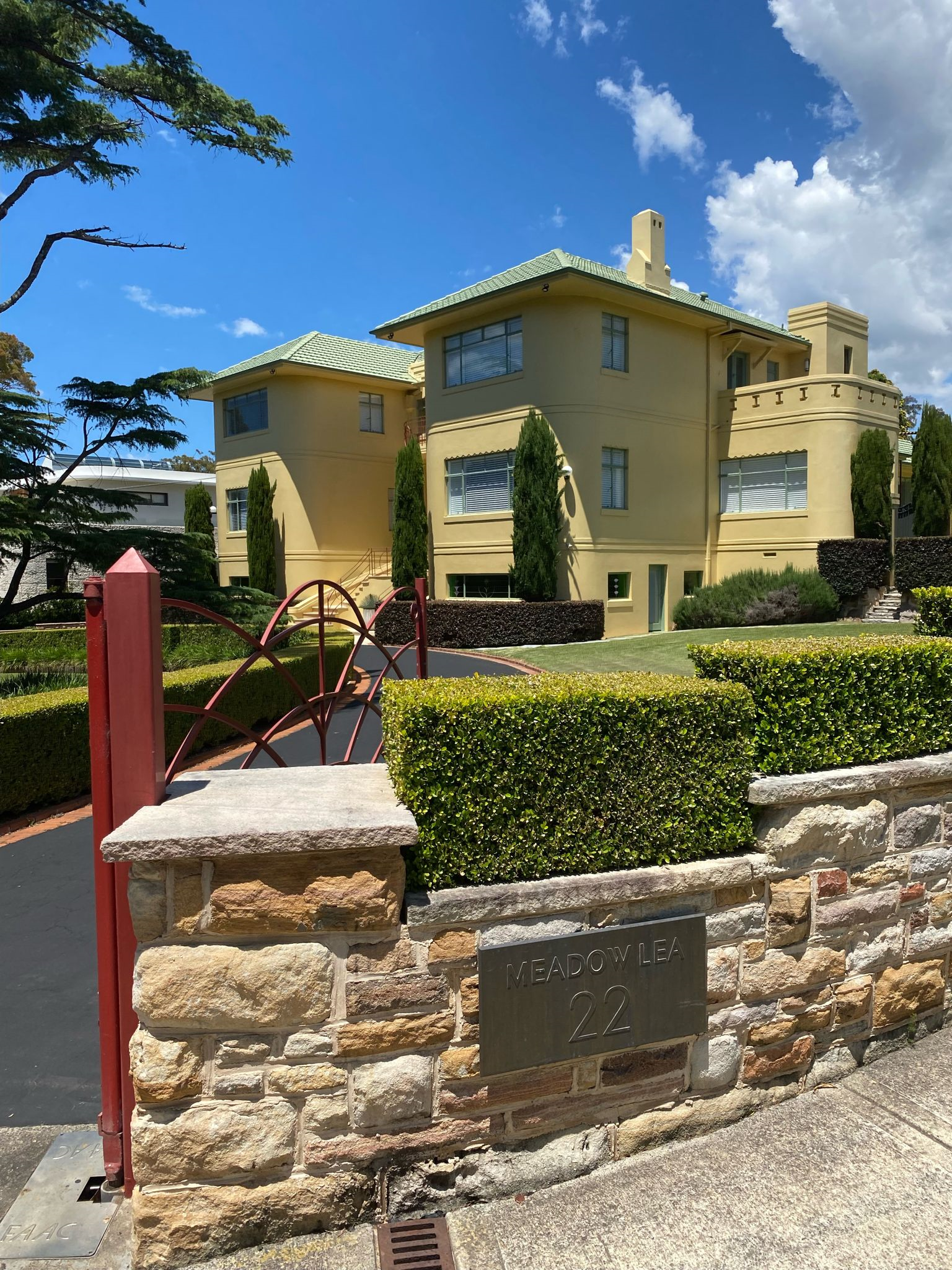
Meadow Lea House
