= Tomaree Lodge =

Tomaree Holiday Lodge
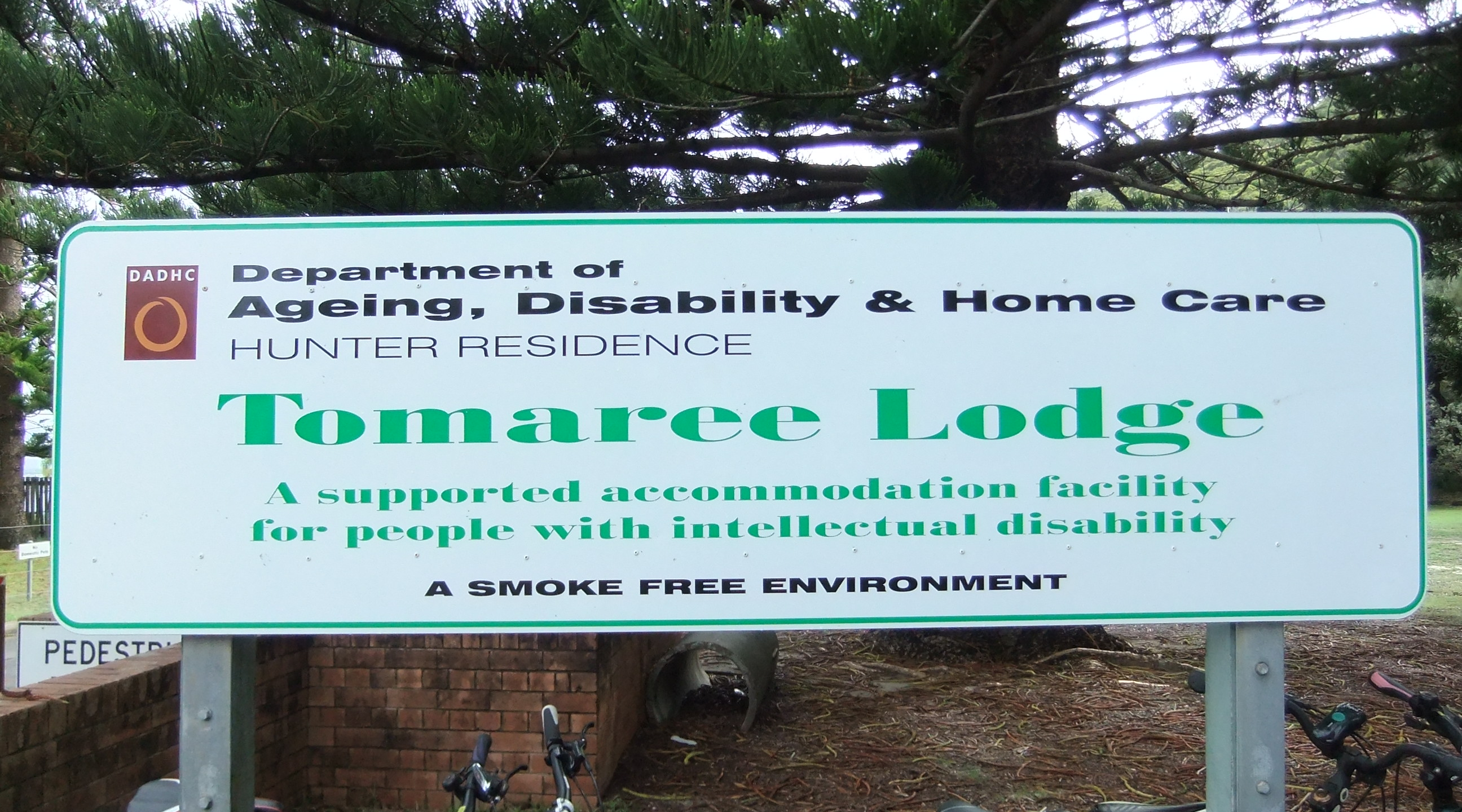
- Sign at the entrance of Tomaree Lodge in 2014

- Location within New South Wales Location within Australia
- 32.7149°S 152.1841°E
- Location: Shoalhaven Road, Shoal Bay, Port Stephens Council, New South Wales, Australia

History
- Built: 1942–

Site notes
- Architect: NSW Government Architect / NSW Department of Public Works

New South Wales Heritage Register
- Official name: Tomaree Holiday Lodge; Tomaree Head; South Head; Psychiatric Hospital; Tomaree Head Army / RAAF Camp
- Type: state heritage (landscape)
- Designated: 2 April 1999
- Reference no.: 835
- Type: Historic Landscape
- Category: Landscape - Cultural
- Builders: NSW Department of Public Works for Commonwealth Government

Tomaree Lodge is a heritage-listed former military camp and hospital and until 2015 was residential disability accommodation at Shoalhaven Road, Shoal Bay, Port Stephens Council, New South Wales, Australia. It was designed by the NSW Government Architect's Office and built from 1942 by the NSW Department of Public Works for the Commonwealth Government. It was formerly known as the Tomaree Head Army/RAAF Camp. It was added to the New South Wales State Heritage Register on 2 April 1999.

== History ==
Tomaree Headland is situated at the southern entrance to Port Stephens. Tomaree Lodge is located in a range of ten predominantly single-storey weatherboard ex-World War Two Australian Army garrison camp buildings on the western foreshore of the headland. Tomaree National Park occupies the remainder of land on Tomaree Head. DADHC land in this vicinity includes the ten buildings used for accommodation (c. 1941), the Recreation Hall, the Administration Block (c. 1980s) and staff cottages, as well as 8.8 hectares of terraced and landscaped land on the western side of the headland. DADHC-owned land in the vicinity accommodates a range of structures including a swimming pool, work sheds, a fisheries laboratory, and at least two relics associated with Fort Tomaree (Tomaree Head Fortifications), namely the surf battery and the footings for a torpedo tube.

The Port Stephens area, including Tomaree Head, is part of land occupied by the Worimi Aboriginal language group. Captain Cook noted Tomaree Head in 1770 when he was travelling along the NSW coast. Following European settlement to the east coast of NSW from 1788, Port Stephens's rich resources were harvested; fishing and cedar getting were the main industries in the early nineteenth century. Port Stephens was occupied by the Australian Agricultural Company from 1824. Point Stephens lighthouse was erected in 1864 to provide safe entrance to Port Stephens.

Under the Crown Lands Alienation Act 1861, Tomaree Head was declared a reserve; it was used for recreational purposes and occasional squatting from the 1860s until the 1930s.

In 1932, Alfred Ernest Dickenson made an application for a special lease of Tomaree Head to graze goats. Dickenson's lease was withdrawn in 1947, with the site having been used for health purposes since this time. In the interim, however, Tomaree Head played an important role in the defence of Australia during the Second World War.

In March 1942, General Douglas MacArthur was appointed the supreme commander of the South West Pacific sector, "with authority over all allied naval, land and air forces in the theatre". This appointment effectively meant that MacArthur had control of the Australian forces. At this time, Port Stephens, including Tomaree Head, was developed as a World War Two military base by a joint Australian Army-United States Navy defence venture.

Port Stephens was a vital part of the Australian coastal defence system during the Second World War, and become the focus of first Australian-United States combined training operations for the South-West Pacific sector. This included Camp Gan Gan (located around 4 km from Nelson Bay), Fort Tomaree (and the associated camps at Tomaree Head) and HMAS Assault on St Nazaire's Road, also known as the Joint Overseas Operational Training School (JOOTS), which became Nelson's Bay Migrant Hostel in the post-war period.

Plans for two camps on Tomaree Head, to service the Fort Tomaree defence installations as part of the military occupation at Port Stephens, were prepared in 1941 by the New South Wales Government Architect / Department of Public Works. It is likely that these buildings were constructed by the New South Wales Department of Public Works on behalf of the Commonwealth Government, which was standard practice at this time due to labour shortages caused by the war. These 1941 plans of Tomaree Head show that most of the buildings dating from this time on the Tomaree Lodge site have been retained in-situ.

The surf battery within DADHC-owned land at Tomaree Head, consisting of two Quick Firing 3 pounder Hoskiss Mark 1 guns, was intended for close defence of the entrance to Port Stephens and the approaches to Shoal Bay: "After investigation, it was later decided to install land based torpedo tubes on the north west side of Tomaree Head. A special launching platform was constructed on the shoreline some 50m to the west of No. 2 Gun (3 pounder) of Surf Section. Support facilities including accommodation were provided for the naval personnel."

Two years after the end of the Second World War, in 1947, the Commonwealth Defence Department transferred the former military camp at Tomaree Head to the Department of Public Health, for use as a convalescent hospital for patients from State hospitals. An undated contour plan of the Tomaree Convalescent Home (c. 1947-50) shows two groups of buildings on Tomaree Head at this time. The site of Tomaree Lodge is referred to on this plan as Lower Tomaree. At this time, it contained sixteen buildings numbered 34 to 52. It appears that these buildings had been used as the Garrison Camp for the C Company of the 20 Australian Garrison (Army) from 1942 until the close of the Second World War. This plan also shows that Upper Tomaree, located further to the south around Tomaree Head, was the site of the former Battery Camp and RAAF Camp during the war. The buildings at Upper Tomaree were demolished, and the site is now within the Tomaree National Park.

When the former Military Camp had been acquired by the New South Wales Government, it reportedly had been "an abandoned army camp, which seemed to be suitable for a convalescent hostel, but which had few amenities and little satisfactory accommodation. The first six patients arrived in June, 1947.".

In 1949, the Annual Report for the Inspector General of Mental Hospitals reported that "the establishment of a Convalescent Hostel for mental patients by the adaption of an ex-army camp situated at the southern headland at Port Stephens is more half completed so far as the accommodation required for male patients is concerned. Future development of the Hostel will provide for females as well as male patients, and in the meantime the accommodation for about fifty patients will be put into use.".

Works at Tomaree continued into the 1950s, following the initiation of a "five-year plan of general development" in 1950. This plan involved the demolition of "the old army huts high on the hill" (presumably this is in reference to the camp at Upper Tomaree), with some 're-built in modernised form on the present site to provide additional accommodation for the increasing number of patients enjoying the hostel's peaceful surroundings. The new recreation hall was built from material salvaged with great ingenuity from the old army installations. Garages, workshops and other outbuildings were also erected".

By 1952, the number of patients at the Tomaree Holiday Lodge increased to 118, with a staff of eleven. In 1953-55 "two tennis courts and a concrete cricket pitch were laid in the lawn area in the entrance to the grounds".

In 1960 a holiday scheme was introduced whereby patients from other hospitals were given a two-week holiday at Tomaree before returning to their permanent accommodation; by 1962, there were approximately 40 holiday beds available. During this time, there was a permanent population of around forty residents who carried out maintenance works on the buildings and grounds. In 1965, it was reported that Tomaree Holiday Lodge was "used by the Health Department to provide holiday accommodation for long-stay patients from metropolitan and country psychiatric hospitals", known as Schedule 5 Hospitals. In this year, it was reported that "a new fresh water, white tile, swimming pool equipped with dressing and toilet facilities" was under construction.'

Tomaree National Park, comprising 2266 hectares, was gazetted in 1984. The hospital reserve was divided and the eastern portion of it was added to the park. In 1985, the practice of providing "holiday beds" was suspended when permanent residents were relocated to Tomaree Lodge from the Stockton and Kanangra Centres.

In 1989 the State Government proposed to sell Tomaree Lodge, but the decision was retracted following fierce local opposition. In 1992, Tomaree Lodge was in the ownership of the Department of Health and was included in the Department's s170 Heritage and Conservation Register in this year. By this time, the centre no longer provided respite holiday care for patients at mental hospitals in New South Wales, but was providing long-term accommodation for people with developmental disabilities.

Tomaree Lodge has been operated by DADHC as a Large Residential Centre from 2001, providing accommodation for around 45-50 residents. Today, Tomaree Lodge occupies 8.8 hectares of land on the foreshores of Shoal Bay. Site plans dated to 1942 and 1959 show that Tomaree Lodge has changed little since it was erected in 1942; as at 2008, the buildings on the site were in roughly the same location and configuration as they were in these years.

In 2015, the state government announced that Tomaree Lodge would close to allow for the site to be redeveloped, and began privatising services under the National Disability Insurance Scheme and relocating residents to group homes. A local residents group, the Shoal Bay Community Association, raised concerns about the precinct being sold off to the highest bidder, and proposed that it be managed under a trust to preserve permanent public ownership. The facility was expected to close in 2018-19 upon the completion of the privatised group homes.

In 2019 a number of community groups came together to form the Friends of Tomaree Headland before incorporating in 2020 as The Tomaree Headland Heritage Group Inc. with an elected board of management representing business, tourism, community, historical and environmental groups. The Department of Communities and Justice engaged in a community consultation process to determine the future use of the Tomaree Lodge.

== Description ==
Tomaree Lodge is situated between Tomaree Head and Shoal Bay, at the southern entrance to Port Stephens. Tomaree Lodge comprises a range of predominantly single-storey weatherboard buildings on the western foreshore of the headland. These buildings are mostly ex-World War Two Australian Army garrison camp buildings. The Tomaree National Park (established in 1984) occupies the remainder of Tomaree Head.

DADHC land in the vicinity includes the ten Tomaree Lodge accommodation buildings as well as a number of administrative and amenity buildings, and 8.8 hectares of landscaped (terraced) land on the western side of the headland. Land held by DADHC in this area accommodates a range of structures including a swimming pool, work sheds, a fisheries laboratory, and at least two relics associated with Fort Tomaree, namely the surf battery and the footings for a torpedo tube. The sealed access road to the site terminates in a cul-de-sac with accommodation buildings to the west and administrative buildings to the east. The landscape of the site is terraced, with random rubble retaining walls and features mature Norfolk Island pines. The buildings on the site are mostly single-storey and the clustering of cottages used for accommodation provides a village atmosphere. A stone wall constructed by former residents runs along the foreshore of Shoal Bay.

The ten cottages, which collectively make up Tomaree Lodge, are single-storey weatherboard buildings on the western foreshore of the headland. They were designed and built in 1942 by the New South Wales Government Architect's Office / Department of Public Works on behalf of the Commonwealth Government for use as an Australian Army garrison camp during the Second World War. Typically, these buildings are timber framed and are clad with weatherboard; they tend to have corrugated metal gable roofs. Those built on the embankment have un-rendered or painted brick bases, or engaged brick piers. A number of the cottages have fixed awnings and some retain timber framed double-hung sash windows. Ramps to the buildings, often with timber balustrades provide equitable access to the accommodation.

Internally the cottages typically have timber floors and internal gyprock lining. Building 8 has caneite ceilings, wood grained panelling and exposed trusses. Previously, most of these buildings had internal lining containing asbestos which has been replaced. Internally Building 4 seems to retain the most intact room layout, although the doors have been extended.

Various alterations to the cottages have taken place; the footprint of the cottages extended, alterations made to the roofs or modifications to doors, windows and other fittings. Various modifications have been made to both the site and buildings to allow equitable access, including installation of ramps and widening of doors. Services have been updated and verandahs have sometimes been enclosed and original windows replaced with aluminium-framed glazing. Some of the cottages elevated on brick piers have had brick enclosures built below.

The site contains a range of distinctive features relating to its earlier uses including fortifications and installations, roads, gun placements, and a random rubble walled battery. On the headland's rock platform are random rubble terracing, drains, a roadway and sea walls.

Tomaree Lodge adjoins the Tomaree National Park. The native vegetation of the Tomaree Peninsula is predominantly woodland with a number of identified rare and/or threatened plant species local to this area. The DECC / National Parks and Wildlife Service considers the natural areas have a high conservation value.

=== Condition ===
As at 3 September 2008, Tomaree Lodge comprises a range of buildings dating from its use as an army garrison during the First World War. The buildings are generally in good condition.

The DADHC lands surrounding Tomaree Lodge have high archaeological potential, high archaeological research value and high heritage significance. There are likely to be archaeological remains of the Fort Tomaree Battery Camp, established on the headland in WWII. The camp was adjacent to the torpedo tubes and gun emplacement at the end of the headland and the remains would partly extend into the national park. Evidence may include building footings, artifact deposits, underground services and evidence of changes to the landscape including terracing. There may also be concrete bases and fixtures from searchlight towers, gun platforms and other defence works.

The slope up behind the former Infantry Camp (now Tomaree Lodge) is also likely to contain archaeological evidence associated with the camp and Tomaree Battery, similar to that described above for the Battery Camp. Although the area has been heavily disturbed by WWII activity, given its location it is possible there may be remnant evidence of Aboriginal occupation of the area.

One of the conservation strategies in the endorsed Conservation Management Plan (CMP) prepared for Tomaree Head National Park in 1999 was the systematic site recording and assessment by a qualified Historical Archaeologist for the whole site. A detailed archaeological assessment of this site is recommended in conjunction with the adjoining national park lands.

Tomaree Lodge is a functioning Large Residential Centre which means that most of the buildings on the site are in good working order. Even though many buildings have undergone alterations and additions, the original form of the buildings is generally discernible.

Tomaree Lodge is one of the few known surviving examples of this type of purpose-built accommodation for the military in the State. There are relatively few intact former World War Two army camps in New South Wales.

=== Modifications and dates ===
The original ex-World War Two Australian Army garrison camp at Tomaree Head was modified for use as a hospital in the 1950s. The site has been added to over the second half of the twentieth century to accommodate changing hospital needs, as outlined below.

Modifications to the site have included:

- 1950-1955 (by staff and DPWS) - army huts on hill demolished, rebuilt in modernised form to provide additional accommodation. New recreation hall built from salvaged material. Garages workshops and other building similarly built. Terracing, gardens, drainage, roads, rock work on original pool, land forming to Zenith Beach.
- 1950-55 (DPWS) - major construction work including renovations, conversions of huts to staff cottages, wharf, swimming pools.
- 1953-55 - 2 tennis courts, concrete cricket pitch.
- 1965 - new swimming pool and facilities.
- 1966 - administration building, new kitchens, dining room and balconies.
- 1990s - land transferred to NPWS as part of Tomaree Head National Park.

== Heritage listing ==
Tomaree Lodge has heritage significance at a State level. It has historic significance because of its use as an Army Garrison Camp during the Second World War. The site is a physical demonstration of Port Stephens' important contribution to the Second World War, when it was developed as a military base by the joint Australian Army-United States Navy defence ventures in March 1942, following the appointment of General Douglas MacArthur as supreme commander of the South West Pacific sector.

The site has high archaeological potential and high archaeological research value. There are relatively few intact former World War Two army camps in New South Wales which have such high archaeological potential. Any archaeological relics dating from the World War Two period on the site have the potential to contain information not available from other sources. It also has strong interpretive values and research potential due to its relationship to other World War Two military sites in Port Stephens and Newcastle, including Fort Tomaree (and the associated camps at Tomaree Head), Camp Gan Gan and HMAS Assault, also known as the Joint Overseas Operational Training School (JOOTS).

The site is a landmark on the foreshore of Shoal Bay at the entrance to Port Stephens. The site is rare as one of the few surviving, relatively intact Army garrison camps dating from the Second World War in New South Wales.

While Tomaree Lodge has some representative value as an example of a health facility in the state for people with mental illness and developmental disability, it is unique in this group due to its earlier use as a World War Two Army Camp. There are relatively few intact former World War Two army camps in the state. Tomaree Lodge is one of the few known surviving examples of this type of purpose-built accommodation for the military in the State.

Tomaree Holiday Lodge was listed on the New South Wales State Heritage Register on 2 April 1999 having satisfied the following criteria.

The place is important in demonstrating the course, or pattern, of cultural or natural history in New South Wales.

Tomaree Lodge has State significance because of its prior use as an Army Garrison Camp during the Second World War. The site is a physical demonstration of Port Stephens' important contribution to the Second World War, when it was developed as a military base by the joint Australian Army-United States Navy defence ventures in March 1942, following the appointment of General Douglas MacArthur as supreme commander of the South West Pacific sector.

The place is important in demonstrating aesthetic characteristics and/or a high degree of creative or technical achievement in New South Wales.

Tomaree Lodge has aesthetic significance at a Local level, due to its landmark qualities on the foreshore of Shoal Bay at the entrance to Port Stephens.

The place has a strong or special association with a particular community or cultural group in New South Wales for social, cultural or spiritual reasons.

The social significance of the Tomaree Lodge has not been assessed. However, it is likely that it has strong association with past and present residents and staff. Tomaree Lodge has been, and continues to be, home to many of these people who have spent extended periods of their life there. The significance of Tomaree Lodge to the local community was clearly established when there was vocal public opposition to its sale in 1989.

The place has potential to yield information that will contribute to an understanding of the cultural or natural history of New South Wales.

Tomaree Lodge has technical significance at a State level because the land surrounding it has high archaeological potential and high archaeological research value related to its use during World War Two. There are relatively few intact former World War Two army camps in New South Wales which have such high archaeological potential. Any archaeological relics dating from the World War Two period on the site have the potential to contain information not available from other sources.

Tomaree Lodge has strong interpretive values and research potential due to its relationship to other World War Two military sites in Port Stephens and Newcastle, including Fort Tomaree (and the associated camps at Tomaree Head), Camp Gan Gan and HMAS Assault, also known as the Joint Overseas Operational Training School (JOOTS).

The nine LRCs owned or managed by DADHC (as at January 2009), including the Tomaree Centre, have technical / research significance at a State Level for their potential to explain the ways that residential health facilities for people with mental illness and disabilities in NSW were designed, built and operated, reflecting the changing attitudes and philosophies of care over the twentieth century.

The place possesses uncommon, rare or endangered aspects of the cultural or natural history of New South Wales.

Tomaree Lodge has rarity value at a State level as one of the few surviving, relatively intact Army garrison camps dating from the Second World War in New South Wales. While Tomaree Lodge has some representative value as an example of a health facility in the state for people with mental illness and developmental disability, it is unique in this group due to its earlier use as a World War Two Army Camp.
