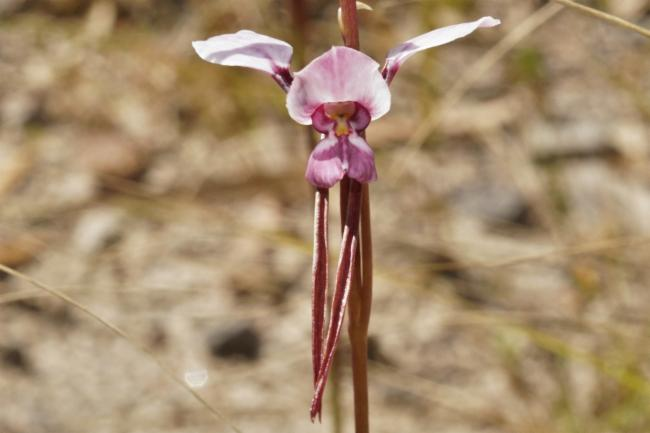
- Diuris arenaria growing near Port Stephens

Scientific classification
- Kingdom: Plantae
- Clade: Tracheophytes
- Clade: Angiosperms
- Clade: Monocots
- Order: Asparagales
- Family: Orchidaceae
- Subfamily: Orchidoideae
- Tribe: Diurideae
- Genus: Diuris
- Species: D. arenaria

Binomial name
- Diuris arenaria D.L.Jones

Synonyms
- Diuris sp. aff. punctata (Nelson Bay)

= Diuris arenaria =

Tomaree donkey orchid

Species of orchid

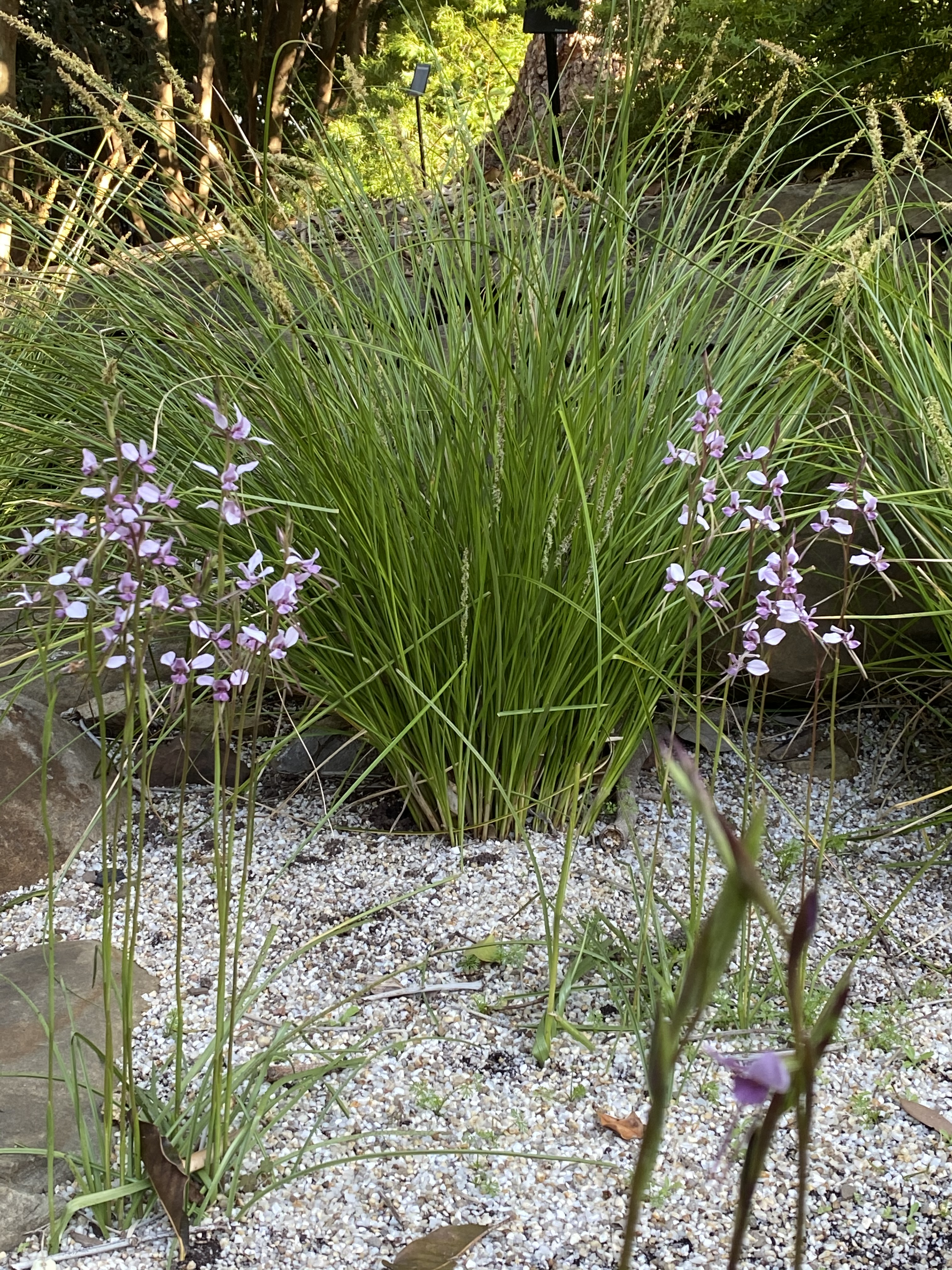
Habit

Diuris arenaria, commonly known as the Tomaree donkey orchid or sand doubletail is a species of orchid which is endemic to a very small area of New South Wales. It has two grass-like leaves and up to nine mauve or light purple and white flowers. It has a very limited distribution near Newcastle.

== Description ==
Diuris arenaria is a tuberous, perennial herb with two linear to lance-shaped leaves 150–500 mm (6–20 in) long, 2–6 mm (0.08–0.2 in) wide and folded lengthwise. Up to nine mauve or light purple and white flowers 20–30 mm (0.8–1 in) wide are borne on a flowering stem 150–500 mm (6–20 in) tall. The dorsal sepal is more or less erect, egg-shaped, 10–18 mm (0.4–0.7 in) long and 7–11 mm (0.3–0.4 in) wide. The lateral sepals are greenish, narrow lance-shaped, 15–40 mm (0.6–2 in) long, 1.5–3 mm (0.06–0.1 in) wide, turned downwards and parallel to each other or crossed. The petals are erect or turned backwards with an egg-shaped blade 10–17 mm (0.4–0.7 in) long and 6–10 mm (0.2–0.4 in) wide on a blackish stalk 3–6 mm (0.1–0.2 in) long. The labellum is 10–14 mm (0.4–0.6 in) long and has three lobes. The centre lobe is egg-shaped to wedge-shaped, 8–12 mm (0.3–0.5 in) long and 7–11 mm (0.3–0.4 in) wide and the side lobes are narrow oblong, 2.5–5 mm (0.1–0.2 in) long and 1–2 mm (0.04–0.08 in) wide. There are two purple, ridge-like calli extending from the base of the labellum to its midpoint. Flowering occurs from August to September.

== Taxonomy and naming ==
Diuris arenaria was first formally described in 1999 by David Jones from a specimen collected between Nelson Bay and Shoal Bay and the description was published in The Orchadian. The specific epithet (arenaria) is a Latin word meaning "sandy".

== Distribution and habitat ==
The Tomaree donkey orchid is only known from a small part of the Tomaree National Park where it grows in sandy soil in heathy forest.

== Conservation ==
Diuris arenaria is classed as "endangered" under the New South Wales Biodiversity Conservation Act 2016. The main threats to the species are risk of extinction due to small distribution and population size, habitat disturbance and fragmentation, weed invasion and inappropriate fire regimes.
