= Tomaree Head Fortifications =

Fortification in Australia

- Location within New South Wales Location within Australia
- 32.7148°S 152.1866°E
- Location: 2 Shoal Bay Road, Shoal Bay, New South Wales, Australia

New South Wales Heritage Register
- Official name: Tomaree Head Fortifications; Tomaree Head; head Battery; Tomaree Battery and Stephens Battery
- Type: state heritage (built)
- Designated: 22 October 2010
- Reference no.: 1821
- Type: Fortification
- Category: Defence

The Tomaree Head Fortifications is a heritage-listed fortification at 2 Shoal Bay Road, Shoal Bay, New South Wales, Australia. It is also known as Tomaree Head Battery, Tomaree Battery and Stephens Battery. It was added to the New South Wales State Heritage Register on 22 October 2010.

== History ==
=== Radar at Tomaree Head ===
Tomaree Head was one of the first sites selected in an air force project to protect Australia with a ring of radar stations around the continent. The threat of war from Japan was looming, but only three radar sets were available: the project was launched with a special survey to select three sites. Many more radar sets were needed, long range radar, for which the authorities expected a long delay, so it was essential to put the three available radar sets to work in the parts of Australia requiring them most urgently.

The available radar sets were "on loan" from a CSIR facility called the Radiophysics Laboratory, British sets sent for research. The survey was led by two very senior officers: Dr David Martyn, chief of the Laboratory, and Squadron Leader A. G. Pither, the Royal Australian Air Force radar specialist. They flew over the coast from Port Kembla to Forster, selecting sites near Port Kembla, near Terrigal, and at Tomaree Head.

The recommendation by the Services was to locate the "available" radar sets to protect "the vital Newcastle-Sydney-Port Kembla industrial region", which was accepted by the highest authority. Applying this priority, the survey officers used Newcastle Steelworks as their point of reference when deciding on Tomaree Head.

Japan burst into the war before the radar building was started. The British radar set was hastily placed in a vacant bunker in Newcastle. By the time the radar building was completed on Tomaree Head, an Australian radar known as AW was available from the factory. The British set could now be removed and was sent to the place near Terrigal.

The AW radar was made possible by a surprise break-through at the Radiophysics Laboratory. Dr J. H. Piddington adapted the design of a short range radar, a familiar design, producing the range necessary for air warning, no special components needed. A version called LW/AW (light weight/air warning) was acclaimed as the backbone of the RAAF radar network in the island warfare of World War II, represented by a replica at the Australian War Memorial.

The first factory set was ready on 5 April 1942. RAAF radar men took the piano-sized cabinets to Tomaree Head and yanked them up to the summit. The station was on the air by 12 April 1942 and was reporting the positions of aircraft. Tomaree radar was also able to detect ships; the station reported the location of the Japanese submarine that shelled Newcastle on 8 June 1942.

=== Fortifications and functions ===
The WWII gun emplacements and related structures on Tomaree Head were established from 1941 as part of a system for the defence of the east coast of Australia. The sites are remnants of a system of defence for the protection of Newcastle and Port Stephens - important enough to warrant its establishment as a separate fire command. It includes sites that were developed for heavy gun emplacements, light weapons and machine gun pits, torpedo tubes, search light stations, No. 20 Radar Station RAAF, barbed wire and stake defence, a command post and barracks and other miscellaneous buildings.

Parts of the headland were cleared. Services such as power and water were provided. Many of the sites have become overgrown. In 1989 the doors of the heavy gun emplacements were welded shut. Before 1939 the Fort Tomaree site was virtually in its natural state and the area had no water and no power or major services of any description, until installed by the RAAF, AIF and RAN, for their own, and US Army and US Navy, use. The population expanded to many hundreds in the space of a few years. The entire Fort Tomaree headland has, in the main, been an undisturbed and relatively protected area because of its occupation by the NSW Government Health Department. This Government protection has ensured that only relatively little serious damage has been done to these fortifications since the end of World War !!.

The coastal defences comprised:

1. Australian Army seafront and beach front installation including observation posts, radar installations, command and control areas including plotting room data coordination, machine gun emplacements, anti-aircraft emplacements, mortars emplacements and three-man weapons pits;
2. RAN seawards defences including minefield observation systems, anti-torpedo nets, hydrophones and torpedo tubes. These were, in general, controlled from the Port War Signal Station situated on Nelson Head
3. RAAF radar station at the peak of the Tomaree Headland reported its plots of aircraft to No. 2 Fighter Sector in Newcastle. Any necessary commands would then be given to RAAF Base Williamtown. The Sector was a link in the chain providing early warning of enemy approach.

The RAAF provided an 11 kW, 415 V electricity service to the area which was used to power the rotating antenna and this was transformed for the use of the other services. Most listed fortress equipment was sited directly on Tomaree Headland except the head battery and the RAN mine and loop control post which were sited at the western end of Shoal Bay Beach and on Nelson Head.

Tomaree Headland itself contains the remains of no less than eighteen fortifications, eighty buildings and many artefacts in various states of preservation.

It is estimated that each month 2,000 men, AIF or US servicemen, passed through this Amphibious Training Centre, (20,000 in total), learning embarkation and debarkation with the RAN landing ships infantry, HMAS Westralia, HMAS Manoora, HMAS Kanimbla and USS Henry T Allen. The exercises involved actually landing under simulated invasion conditions on Zenith, Wreck and Box Beaches. The Amphibious Landing Training Establishment was commissioned as HMAS Assault.

Later, as the war progressed, similar training establishments were established closer to the fast moving front. It was here that the RAN trained its landing craft and crews involved in amphibious invasions of Dutch New Guinea, Tarakan and Balikpapan, as well as the Leyte and Lingayen invasions in the Philippines. Of the 141 ships and landing craft (thirteen Australian built) based at Port Stephens in October 1943, thirty-six were controlled by HMAS Assault and 105 by the US Navy. The Tomaree seawards and seafront defences were progressively strengthened, as their strategic importance increased, to create Fort Tomaree which protected the first Allied Combined Operations, Landing Training Centre in the south-west Pacific theatre, for the invasion of the Japanese held islands in the Pacific.

In March 1943 a Naval Control Observation Bunker ("Head Battery") was constructed below the Nelson Head Light (Inner Light) for use in detecting submarines and, in conjunction with Fort Tomaree, provide surveillance over Providence Bay. An access road was built to the lighthouse where previously only a rough track existed up a steep climb from Little Beach. Prior to the war, all supplies were taken up on a sled pulled by a horse. The Nelson head Battery was abandoned in August 1943 and dismantled. Only the Control building remains. The exterior of the control observation bunker was inspected but the remains of the gun emplacement(s) were not inspected and so the claim that the emplacements no longer remained could not be verified.

With Japan's invasion of South-East Asia and occupation of the Pacific islands to Australia's north in 1942 it became necessary to establish training camps with the object of training personnel from all three armed services (navy, army and air force) in joint operations to retake the captured islands. In June 1942 a Royal Marine officer, Commander, F. N. Cook, and Lieut-Colonel Hope inspected sites on the east coast to establish a School of Combined Operations. Port Stephens was selected because of its defendable port, safe anchorage away from Japanese submarines and sparse population.

The military installations commenced in September 1942 were Fort Tomaree on Tomaree and Nelson Heads, HMAS Assault I at Fly Point and along the shores of Nelson Bay. Work on the RAAF radar station on the peak of Tomaree had begun in February 1942 . These installations joined the 1941 Gan Gan Army Combined Training Centre located inland from Salamander Bay.

In October 1943 the Amphibious Training Centre was closed and only boat crews continued to be trained at HMAS Assault. By August 1944 the base at Port Stephens had been put into care and maintenance. In 1943, along with the closure of the (Nelson) Head Battery and the Amphibious Training Centre at HMAS Assault, the lower camp at Tomaree (the infantry camp) was also closed and turned over to the Volunteer Defence Corps for training.

In 1947 the infantry camp at Tomaree was transferred from the Commonwealth Department of Defence to the NSW Department of Public Health. In 1950 the whole of Tomaree headland was transferred for hospital purposes. From 1960 until 1985 the former infantry base at Tomaree was used as a holiday and recuperation camp and from 1985 onwards it was used exclusively for permanent mental patients, associated with Tomaree Lodge. Tomaree Headland comprises about 35,616ha of previously typical natural coastal environment, zoned as Environmental Protection Coastal Lands.

In 1993 the Royal Australian Air Force removed the radar tower.

In 2018, the site is part of Tomaree National Park, in which the Fort Tomaree Walk takes visitors to the remains of the fortifications.

There are three precincts related to the operation of Fort Tomaree on the Tomaree Headland:

- Batteries and Battery (or Upper) Camp
- Infantry (or Lower) Camp
- Surf Batteries and torpedo tube
- RAAF radar station.

A number of buildings as well as site features including fortifications and installations, roads, gun placements, random rubble walled battery and associated features. On the headland's rock platform are random rubble terracing, drains, roadway and sea walls.

Tomaree Head was developed as a World War II military base by a joint Australian Army-United States Navy defence venture. Used as part of coastal defence system. It was the focus of first Australian-United States combined training operations for the South-West Pacific sector.

The Tomaree Hostel occupies buildings of the former infantry camp of Fort Tomaree. The infantry camp was on the landward side of the fortifications of the Fort and provided defence for the landward approaches to the Fort.

The hostel is a collection of timber-framed and timber and asbestos cement-clad barracks buildings along the foreshore at the end of Shoal Bay Road. E. Martin states that the buildings were original buildings rebuilt in their current locations. However, examination of the original plans indicates that the remaining timber buildings are located in the same locations as the original buildings of the infantry camp. Some of the buildings away from the waterfront have been demolished and replaced with brick buildings.

== Description ==
Tomaree Head is a 162m high hill at the southern entrance to Port Stephens. It is covered with natural vegetation and includes some steep cliffs and exposed geological formations on the east side facing the ocean. A flat section is on the west side facing Port Stephens but this is now occupied by the Tomaree Lodge, which is itself heritage-listed. Extensive views are available from various vantage points.

In 1940, Port Stephens was seen as a large harbour close to the vulnerable yet essential steelworks in Newcastle. An unguarded Port Stephens could have provided an easy landing place for any hostile force. The guns at Newcastle were too far away to protect Port Stephens. Tomaree was constructed by 1942 with six inch guns, torpedo tubes, mortars, machine guns, rifle pits, search lights, command posts, observation posts, barbed wire entanglements and accommodation (later Tomaree Lodge). The guns were never fired in anger. After 1943, the artillery defences were downgraded. Minor gun positions were closed, artillery crews were changed and gunners were transferred to other areas and replaced with Volunteer Defence Corps. No 20 Radar Station continued operating until 1947. In 1993 the RAAF removed the turning gear that formed the base of the radar antenna for restoration and, later, returned it to the summit, near its original location. Part of the headland was taken over by the Department of Health. (Tomaree Lodge and the rest of the headland was incorporated into the Tomaree National Park).

== Heritage listing ==
Tomaree Head is a prominent landform at the entrance to Port Stephens and one that has been important to Aboriginal people and is included in their stories. The geological formation of the unusual combination of landform aeolian sands and volcanic derived clays is of some interest and research potential. Tomaree Head has been associated with many aspects of Australia's history from initial discovery by Captain Cook, early explorers, seafarers, settlers and industry including fishing, timber and farming. One of the outstanding qualities of Tomaree Head is its aesthetic appeal as a prominent landform with steep cliffs to the ocean and natural landscape in the attractive setting of Port Stephens.

These qualities were recognised early in the nineteenth century by explorers' records and visits to the area and continue to be recognised by the extensive recreational and leisure use the area receives today. Tomaree Head, together with places near Sydney and Port Kembla, was chosen for Australia's first radar station. In 1942 it housed the first Australian-made AW (air warning) radar set. The fortifications that were, and remain, on the headland were important parts of the coastal defence network around strategic facilities from Port Stephens to Jervis Bay. It remains one of the few non-urban forts that protected Australia and were important parts of the protection of Newcastle and the RAAF base at Williamtown. The remnant parts provide historical, educational and research potential for all visitors. The extent of facilities that were an integral part of the Tomaree Head Fort is more varied than most of the other coastal defence posts in NSW and elements such as the radar station were the first produced in Australia.

Tomaree Head Fortifications was listed on the New South Wales State Heritage Register on 22 October 2010 having satisfied the following criteria.

The place is important in demonstrating the course, or pattern, of cultural or natural history in New South Wales.

Tomaree Head has been an identifiable element in the landscape and as such has been used as a beacon by Aboriginal people as well as early European explorers, seafarers and settlers. It has been associated with the exploration and development of NSW from the European discovery of NSW by Captain James Cook. Fishing, timber and agricultural pursuits have been part of the development around Tomaree as well as recreational pursuits from the early 19th century.

Tomaree Head was identified as a Reserve from 1861 and has retained this status since despite some ad hoc use by itinerant farmers, the development of the fortifications during World War II and more recently, the hospital. It is one of the remaining non-urban reserves in NSW.

The Tomaree fortifications are of historical importance as a component of the World War II coastal defence network installed along the coast of NSW to protect strategic places. The location on the head protected Port Stephens and the network of adjacent rivers and watercourses and the hinterland. It also was an important part of the protection of the industrial installations at Newcastle. The complex of fortifications that were located at Tomaree Head is of interest and it remains as one of a few non-urban forts. It is also one of the few fortifications that retain some elements such as rifle pits.

The radar was the first air warning radar made in Australia. Designed by the Council of Scientific and Industrial Research, the aerial and turning gear were made by the Eveleigh Railway Workshops of New South Wales Railways and the electronics were assembled by the Gramophone Company, all located in Sydney. It was the first to be manned by mechanics wholly trained by the RAAF, first to have a building designed and built for radar and the longest serving RAAF radar in World War II. The site was also associated with some of the largest troop movements on the Australian mainland with beach training by allied troops. Tomaree Head is representative of the ongoing concern of Australian governments since the 19th century with the defence of Australia's coastline and fear of invasion that existed during World War II.

The place has a strong or special association with a person, or group of persons, of importance of cultural or natural history of New South Wales's history.

The lives of the few European occupants of Tomaree Head pre-World War II have passed into local folklore although few people except those of old families know about this. The fact that it had some importance to Aboriginal people is also part of its social significance. For those who spent time at Tomaree during World War II Tomaree Head was an important part of their lives and is the place where specific memories and friendships were established. The head has been part of the recreational challenges of the local community and visitors to the area from early in the 19th century and as such has some social value.

The place is important in demonstrating aesthetic characteristics and/or a high degree of creative or technical achievement in New South Wales.

Tomaree Head's complement, Yacaaba, on the north side is slightly higher at 217 m (712 ft) but is less accessible than Tomaree Head. The prominence of the headland was included in Aboriginal stories and beliefs partly for the aesthetic appeal. One of the greatest attributes of Tomaree Head is the extremely high quality views or the visual catchments to be gained from it., not only from its summit but from some sections of its slopes and from its shores. Its height enabled it to be used as a major lookout, both in peacetime - e.g. by aboriginals to look for shoals of fish - and in wartime. To virtually all points of the compass there are stunning views containing both land and sea scapes, dotted with some cultural elements. The greater part of these views contain varying compositions of the natural elements of mountains, natural vegetation and water, which are rated highly by humans of whatever cultural background.

The place has potential to yield information that will contribute to an understanding of the cultural or natural history of New South Wales.

This helps explain the site's appeal to a wide range of visitors. The internal views of natural woodlands, ancient rock formations and winding tracks give visual pleasure. The plunging cliffs, slopes and rock formations along the eastern flank and waters edge are highly dramatic. The headland has landmark qualities. It is visible from afar, both from at sea as the impressive southern portal to Port Stephens, and from many points on the surrounding land and the waters of the harbour. Some people would suggest that the functional architecture of the wartime defences is in contrast with the natural features and has an aesthetic appeal.

The place possesses uncommon, rare or endangered aspects of the cultural or natural history of New South Wales.

The native vegetation of the Tomaree Peninsula is predominantly the woodland type with a number of identified rare and/or threatened plant species to this local area. The NSW National Parks and Wildlife Service considers the natural areas have high conservation values. The Tomaree Headland is listed on the State Heritage Register for its ecological significance.

The place is important in demonstrating the principal characteristics of a class of cultural or natural places/environments in New South Wales.

Tomaree demonstrates the natural values of geological formation and landscape of the area. It is also illustrative of the fortifications that were installed as part of a complex of NSW coastal defences during World War II.
