= No. 20 Radar Station RAAF =

No. 20 Radar Station RAAF was a Royal Australian Air Force radar station formed at Nelson Bay, New South Wales, Australia, during World War II on 12 April 1942. The radar station was set up upon Tomaree Head, Port Stephens and became operational on 1 June 1942.

== Overview ==
The radar was the first HMV (Aust) produced AW radar. The radar site necessitated the need to build a high voltage power line to provide electricity to power the rotating radar antennae. The radar station was responsible for plotting flight movements from RAAF Base Williamtown, plus all flight movements along the coast in the vicinity and reporting to No. 2 Fighter Sector HQ. The radar was made non-operational on 1 September 1945 and was disbanded on 21 January 1947.

After World War II, the radar antennae was left on the headland until it was knocked over during a bad storm. The collapsed radar tower was recovered by the RAAF in 1993 from the top of Tomaree Head. The turning gear base of the radar tower was returned to its original position in 2001 with the rest of the radar tower stored at RAAF Base Williamtown.

The remains of the radar station are listed on the New South Wales Heritage Register as part of the Tomaree Head Fortifications.

== Commanding officers ==
- R.E. Abbott (PltOff) - 12 April 1942
- L.F. Sawford (PltOff) - 30 June 1942
- W.deB. Perceval (FltLt) - 4 October 1942
- J.D.H. Muir (PltOff) - 18 June 1943
- A.H. Philp (PltOff) - 3 September 1943
- W.G. Denney (FltLt) - 8 September 1943
- R.E. Oldfield (FlgOff) - 6 December 1943
- R.J. Ferrie (FltLt) - 24 December 1944
- P.R. Watson (FltLt) - 5 April 1945
- A.P. Wallace (FltLt) - 29 August 1945
- T.J. Campbell (Sgt) - 15 September 1945
