= Captain John Dalton =

English sailor

Captain John Dalton (1833–1912) was an English sailor. He alongside his seven children were among the first European families to settle into Nelson Bay, New South Wales.

== Early life ==
Born on 22 October 1833 at Harpham Field House in Yorkshire, England. He was the eldest child of Thomas and Ann Dalton.

== Sailing career ==
When his father he joined the North Sea Scroop. He worked for Danish transport company transporting transport in both the Crimean War and the Indian Mutiny. He served on SS Maitland and went on to become captain and sailed between Australia, Newcastle, South Africa, Ireland and Scotland. He became a qualified Master Marnier and sailed between Newcastle and Sydney on the streamer Waratah. SS Kingsly was a fish and oyster boat which worked between Port Stephens to Paddy's Markets.

== Moving to Australia ==
He earned a living shipping vegetable to Sydney from the Hawkesbury River. Then he moved his family to Port Stephens to settle at Nelson Bay. In 1882 he built his house Westward Ho on 40 acres at Nelson Bay. On 27 November 1911 he purchased a property in Stockton.

== Personal life ==
He married his first wife Margaret Otto and had a daughter Annie born on 25 September 1878 before Margaret died of smallpox. As a young man he was thrown overboard in Atlantic and never learnt to swim. On 3 July 1882 he married Eliza Jane Cox at the Chapel House in Castlereagh Street, Sydney. They had six children together. James born on 25 May 1883, John born on 25 May 1885, Frances born 12 July 1887, Eliza (Ida) born on 12 July 1887, Henry (Harry) born on 4 March 1893 and William Dalton born 11 March 1897.

On 11 August 1912 he died in Pepitee Pah Private Hospital. He is buried at the Methodist section of Sandgate Cemetery.
