= Fingal Bay =

- Suburb
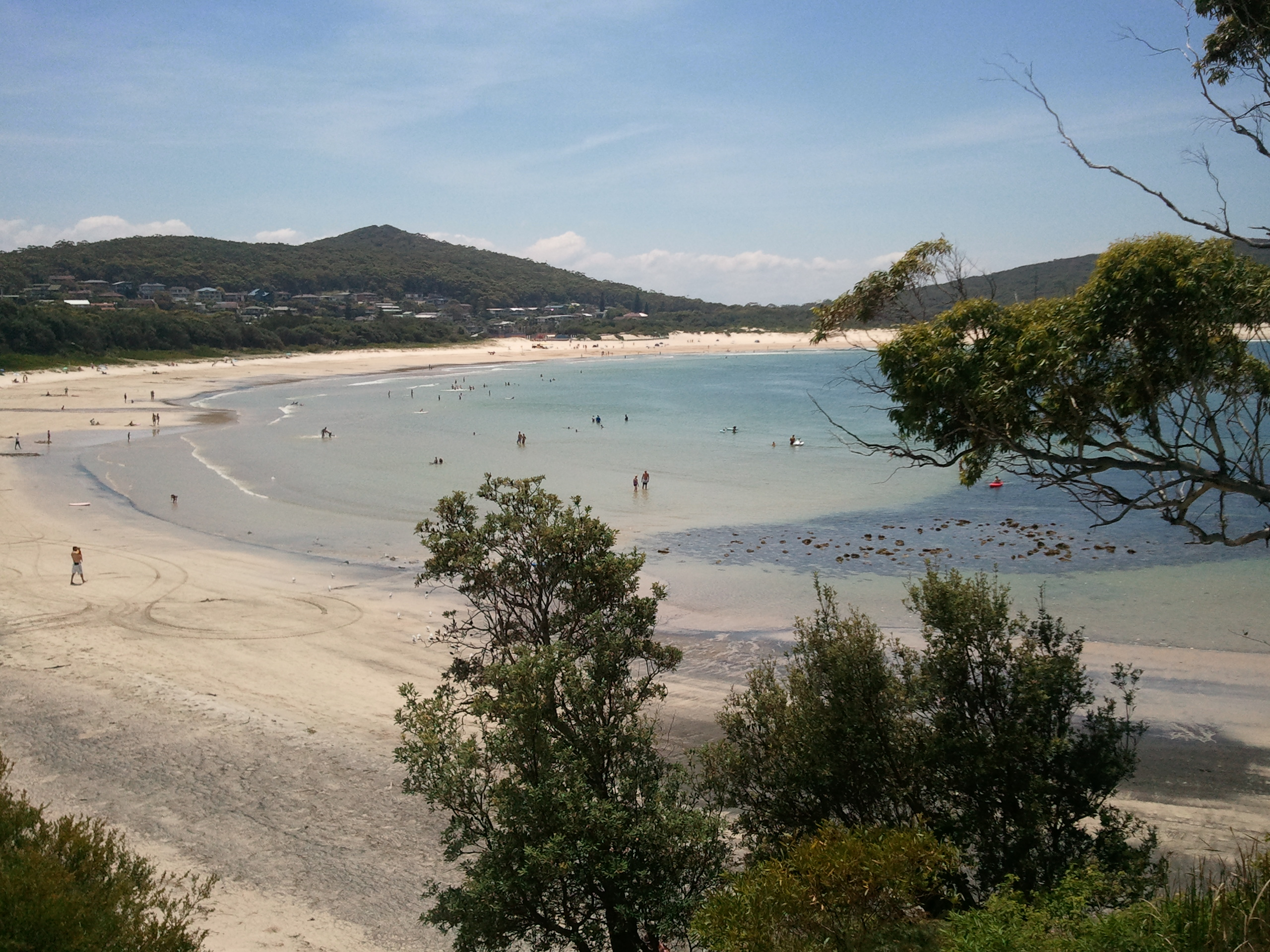
- Fingal Bay

- Interactive map of Fingal Bay
- Coordinates: 32°45′S 152°10′E
- Country: Australia
- State: New South Wales
- Region: Hunter
- LGA: Port Stephens Council
- Location: 213 km (132 mi) NNE of Sydney; 65 km (40 mi) NE of Newcastle; 50 km (31 mi) ENE of Raymond Terrace

Government
  - State electorate: Port Stephens
  - Federal division: Paterson

Area
  - Total: 9.3 km^{2} (3.6 sq mi)

Population
  - Total: 1,635 (2021 census)
  - Density: 175.8/km^{2} (455/sq mi) (Note: Only 1.1 square kilometres (0.4 sq mi) (approximately 12%) of the suburb is inhabited. For this reason, the population density figure shown is that of the inhabited area, rather than for the whole suburb, as this is more representative of the actual population density. The average population density for the whole suburb is 161.6/km^{2} (419/sq mi).)
- Time zone: UTC+10 (AEST)
  - Summer (DST): UTC+11 (AEDT)
- Postcode: 2315
- County: Gloucester
- Parish: Tomaree
- Mean max temp: 27.3 °C (81.1 °F)
- Mean min temp: 8.9 °C (48.0 °F)
- Annual rainfall: 1,348.1 mm (53.07 in)
Suburbs around Fingal Bay
Nelson Bay	Shoal Bay	Tasman Sea
Nelson Bay	Fingal Bay	Tasman Sea
One Mile, Tasman Sea	Tasman Sea	Tasman Sea

Fingal Bay is the easternmost suburb of the Port Stephens local government area in the Hunter Region of New South Wales, Australia. The only population centre is the township of the same name, which itself is named after the adjacent, small, semi-circular bay. At the 2021 census, the population of the town was 1,635.

Except for the township, most of Fingal Bay is included in the Tomaree National Park, which includes forested areas, coastal scrubland, beaches and most of the Fingal headland. The suburb does not include the bay itself.

== Fingal Bay ==
Fingal Bay is about 1.75 km (1.1 mi) across at its widest point and 1.3 km (0.8 mi) from the mouth to the beach. The northeastern head of the bay is the Point Stephens headland, which is connected to the mainland via Fingal Spit, a sand spit about 900 m (2,953 ft) long. Waters to the northeast of the spit are known as "Fly Roads". Crossing between the mainland and the headland along the spit is considered dangerous. According to a sign on the beach, people have died crossing the spit, which is covered by breaking waves at high tide. The south-western head of the bay is Fingal Head, which is located southeast of the town. Between the two heads, the mouth is over 1 km (0.6 mi) wide. The bay includes a sandy beach about 1.9 km (1.2 mi) long.

=== History ===
The bay was originally known as "False Bay", because it could be mistaken for the entrance to Port Stephens. The name "Fingal Bay" appeared on an 1845 map prepared by Captain Phillip Parker King.

== Heritage listings ==
Fingal Bay has a number of heritage-listed sites, including Point Stephens Light on Point Stephens, or Fingal Island.

=== Tourism campaign ===
Fingal Spit was a location for the 2006 "So where the bloody hell are you?" advertising campaign filmed for Tourism Australia and appears at the end of the advertisement.

== Headland and Point Stephens ==
The irregularly shaped headland, also known as Fingal Island, covers an area of approximately 1 km^{2} (0.4 sq mi), most of which is part of the Tomaree National Park, and reaches 75 m (246 ft) in height. Point Stephens was connected to the mainland prior to the "Maitland gale" in 1891. The southeasternmost point of the headland was named "Point Stephens" by Captain Cook when he passed on 11 May 1770, honouring Sir Philip Stephens who was Secretary to the Admiralty. Stephens was a personal friend of Cook and had recommended him for command of the voyage. It seems Cook's initial choice had actually been Point Keppel (named after Augustus Keppel, a Lords Commissioner of the Admiralty), but instead he used Keppel later when he named Keppel Bay. The name first appeared on chart 1070, prepared by Captain Phillip Parker King in 1845.

=== Lighthouse ===
As early as 1857, the need for a lighthouse on Point Stephens was identified, due to the proximity to the entrance of Port Stephens, and the dangers of the local coastline to ships. A 21 m (69 ft) high stone lighthouse was subsequently constructed in 1862. In 1973 the lighthouse keeper was replaced by automated system powered by solar. The light is 38 m (125 ft) above mean sea level and has a range of 28 km (15 nmi).

== Transport ==
Port Stephens Coaches operate local services to Newcastle as well as an express service to Sydney.
