= Point Stephens Light =

Lighthouse in New South Wales, Australia

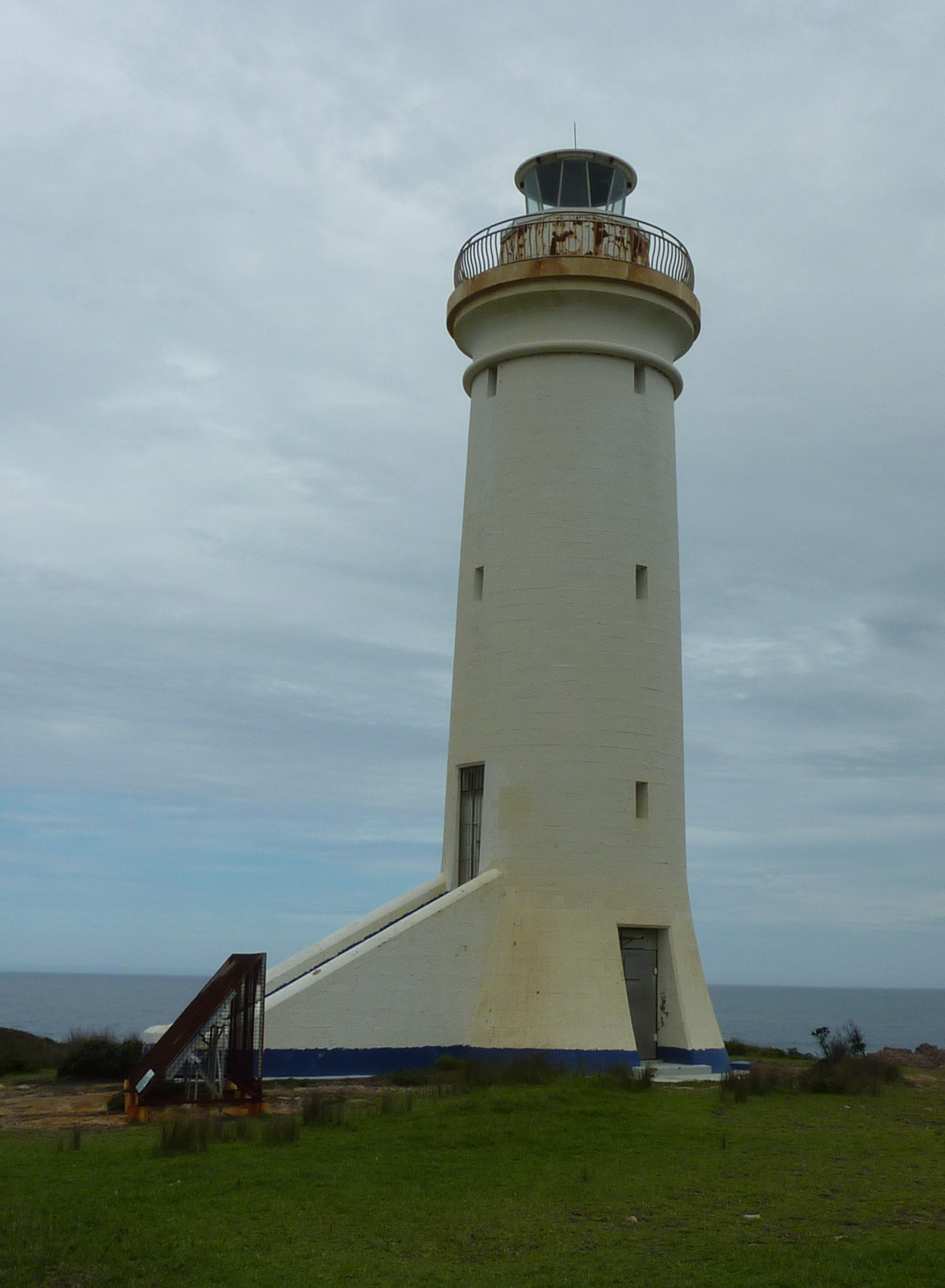
- Location: Point Stephens, New South Wales, Australia
- Coordinates: 32°44′49″S 152°12′04″E

Tower
- Constructed: 1862
- Construction: sandstone (tower)
- Automated: 1973
- Height: 21 m (69 ft)
- Shape: Cylindrical tower with balcony and lantern
- Markings: white (tower), white (lantern)
- Power source: solar power
- Operator: Australian Maritime Safety Authority
- Heritage: Heritage Act — State Heritage Register

Light
- Focal height: 38 m (125 ft)
- Intensity: 40,700 candela
- Range: 17 nmi (31 km; 20 mi)
- Characteristic: Fl(4) W 30s

New South Wales Heritage Register
- Official name: Point Stephens Lighthouse Group
- Type: Built
- Criteria: a, c, e, f, g
- Designated: 2 April 1999
- Reference no.: 01005

The Point Stephens Light is a heritage-listed active lighthouse located on Point Stephens, a point on an unnamed headland at the east of Fingal Bay, 4.25 km (2.64 mi) south of the entrance of Port Stephens, New South Wales, Australia. The light serves to assist vessels entering Port Stephens. It is considered an endangered lighthouse due to remote location and old age.

Proposed in 1857, the heritage-listed lighthouse was built in 1862. Designed by Alexander Dawson, the New South Wales Government Architect at that time, both the lighthouse's flared base and the keeper's cottages combined terrace are unique architectural features for the period. The light source used was originally kerosene lamps, which upgraded in 1912 to a Dalén light, upgraded again to electric light in 1960, automated in 1973, and finally converted to solar power in 1990. In 1991, the last caretaker withdrew from the premises and very soon after the keeper's cottages were vandalised and burned.

The tower is designed in the form of a Doric column. It is divided into four stories with a spiral stairway, and topped by a gallery carrying the lantern. The keeper's cottages are three one story cottages, sharing a roof. Other structures which still stand at the location are a circa 1930 privy and workshop built in the 1950s.

The lighthouse is managed as part of the Tomaree National Park. Access to the lighthouse is difficult, either through a narrow spit of sand at low tide or by boat.

== History ==
As early as 1857, the need for a lighthouse on Point Stephens was identified, due to the proximity to the entrance of Port Stephens, and the dangers of the local coastline to ships. Another reason was that mariners were mistaking the entrance to Fingal Bay for that of Port Stephens. At least twenty four vessels are known to have been wrecked in the area. the most serious being the Dove in 1828 with the loss of seven lives, and the Pandora in 1836 with five lives. Another notable wreck was the Florence Irving in 1877.

The lighthouse was finally built in 1862 and first lit officially on 1 May 1862. It was designed by Alexander Dawson, the New South Wales Government Architect at that time, with a flared base and an external stairwell, an unusual feature for lighthouses in the time and area. The lighthouse keepers' cottages were also unique, built in Victorian Gothic style, with both the principal keeper and the two assistants sharing the same roof and a combined terrace.

The original apparatus was a 3.0-metre (10 ft) Wilkins & Co. catadioptric. The light source was twelve kerosene lamps with a parabolic reflector for each lamp, on a revolving iron frame, in four groups of three. Two groups were white and two groups were red, resulting in a light characteristic of an alternating red and white, with intensities of 500 cd and 200 cd, respectively. It was originally manned by three keepers.

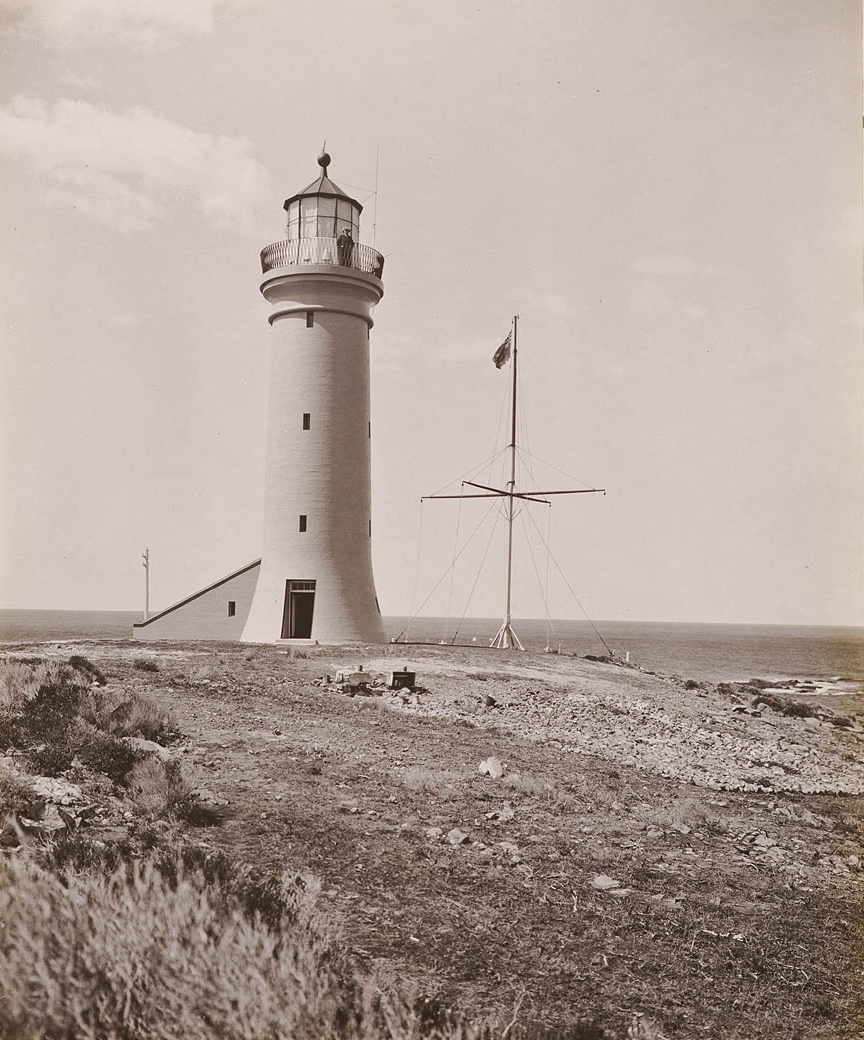
Port Stephens lighthouse, 1902

In 1901, the keeper's quarters went through major repairs, replacing the original slate tiles with terracotta ones. This was followed with the replacement of the steps handrail in 1903. A 1903 report criticised the light, saying that the red flashes were only visible for half the distance of the white ones, confusing navigators. This led to a recommendation to remove the red shades, resulting in a new characteristic of one white flash every minute, and later to upgrade the light to a quick group flashing dioptric light. Another report in 1912 stated that the station was in good condition, but criticised the low power of the light, and recommended withdrawing two of the keepers. However, all of these recommendations were not acted upon until 1 July 1922, when the apparatus was upgraded to a revolving Dalén light with an intensity of 20,000 cd, and the manning reduced to two keepers. In 1932 the original gallery handrails, also supplied by Wilkins & Co., were replaced with steel gas pipe and mild steel rods.

In 1960, the lighthouse was electrified and connected to the mains electricity through a submarine power cable, and a backup diesel generator was installed in the basement of the tower. In March 1973 the lantern was replaced with a smaller 2.1-metre (7 ft) diameter fiberglass lantern (NAL-1 type) and a PRB-21 fully automated hexagonal lamp array with a rotating pedestal was installed. The lower part of the original Wilkins & Co. lantern was retained, together with the 1932 railings. As the tower was now fully automated, the keepers were withdrawn, and the keeper's quarters were no longer needed for the operation of the light. All logs, drawings and furniture were therefore burned as surplus by the Department of Transport's employees, and the buildings were set ready for demolition. However, a last minutes campaign by one of the last keepers and by locals was successful, and the buildings were therefore leased to the National Trust of Australia (NSW), which was responsible for its conservation, and a caretaker in turn leased them from the National Trust.

In 1973, the lighthouse keeper was replaced by automated system powered by solar. There three lighthouse families living there were two month supply of food and barge called Bomb Snow in case they would cut off due to rough seas.

In 1990,^{b} following a 1989 failure of the submarine cable and problems with the diesel generator, the light was converted to solar power with battery storage. The caretaker stayed in the premises until March 1991, when lease arrangement difficulties and the previous failure of the mains forced the caretaker's withdrawal. It only took until September 1991 for vandals to destroy the keepers' cottages by fire. In 1992 the Australian Construction Services cleared the site and stabilised some of the building elements, and a security fence was installed.

In 1998, management of the Tomaree National Park, in which the lighthouse is located, was transferred to the NSW National Parks & Wildlife Service and the tower received some long due restoration, which completed in October 1998. At a cost of A$85,000 the walls were cleaned and covered with a special waterproof membrane system, the cast steel staircase refitted and the lantern room resealed for waterproofing.

The current light source is a solar-powered LED array. It shows a characteristic of four white flashes every thirty seconds (Fl.(4)W. 30s).^{a} It has a range of 17 nautical miles (31 km; 20 mi) and an intensity of 40,700 candelas.

== Structures ==
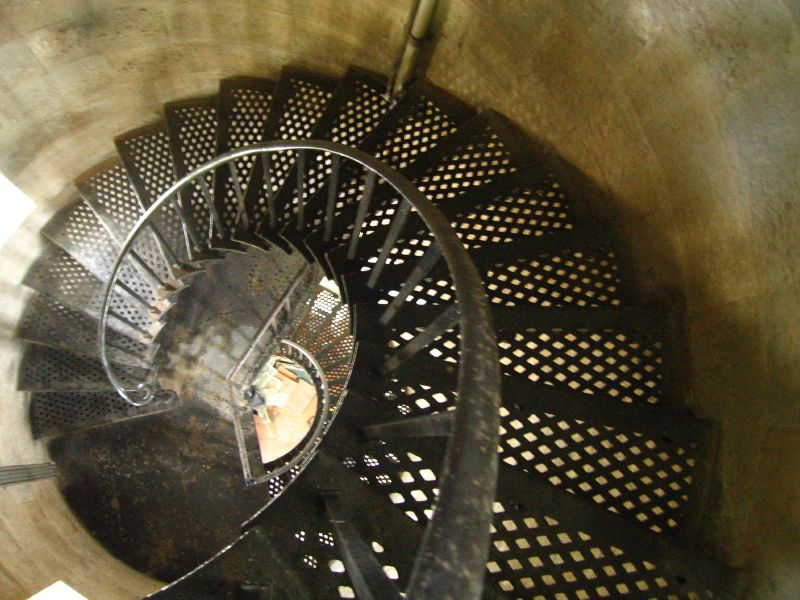
The spiral stairway

=== The tower ===
The lighthouse is located on the south-east extremity of the point. The unusual design of the tower relates to the form of a Doric column, with a flared base and ramped approached enabled using of the base for equipment.

The walls of the tower are constructed of sandstone blocks, brought by ship as ballast from Sydney, dressed outside and inside, and painted white. The walls' thickness varies from 2 metres (6 ft 7 in) at the bottom, in a concave slope to 0.6 metres (2 ft 0 in) at the top. The tower walls are carried up above the lantern floor to support the metal framework for the lantern. The gallery is surrounded by the 1932 gas pipe railing.

The interior of the tower is divided by iron floors and spiral stairways into four stories. The ground floor was originally used for oil store, and it now houses the light equipment, including a generator. Access to the tower is through the ramped stone steps on the north, entering the first floor.

Originally, the tower was topped with a glass lantern, which was replaced with a fiberglass one in 1973. The original lantern is now held by the Nelson Bay Historical Society.

=== The keepers' house ===
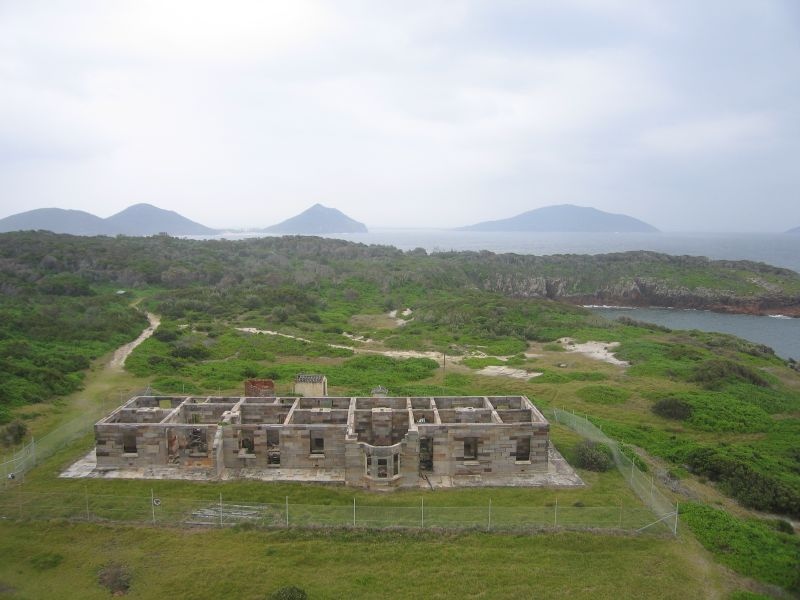
Ruins of the cottages near Point Stephens lighthouse, view from the lighthouse.

The keeper's house is located about 13 metres (43 ft) north of the tower. It is the only example in Australia of a terrace of lighthouse keepers' quarters. It was probably completed slightly later than the lighthouse, as building materials were continuing to be sent from Sydney after the official opening.

The terrace comprises three one story cottages, a six-room cottage for the principal keeper and two three room cottages for the assistants, all sharing the same roof. Each of the cottages had a kitchen, a storeroom and a privy. The building was constructed of the same imported sandstone as the lighthouse, dressed outside and plastered inside. The roof was originally made of slate, replaced in 1901 with terracotta, with five chimneys along the ridge and a bay window and gables along the front. A low terrace was built at the rear from random stone. Photographs from the 1950s also show a rear addition with a skillion roof infilling part of the verandah.

Water was originally supplied from two underground rainwater tanks, each 34,800 litres (7,650 imp gal). The residency was served by a single septic system, discharged via an infiltration bed to the north east of the property.

As mentioned above, the keeper's house was gutted by vandal fire in September 1991. In early 1992 a fence was installed and the chimneys and gables were stabilised by new brickwork.

=== Other structures ===
Several service structures used to be located behind the resident buildings, namely kitchen, privies and stores, and were destroyed in the 1991 fire, leaving only parts of the timber walls.

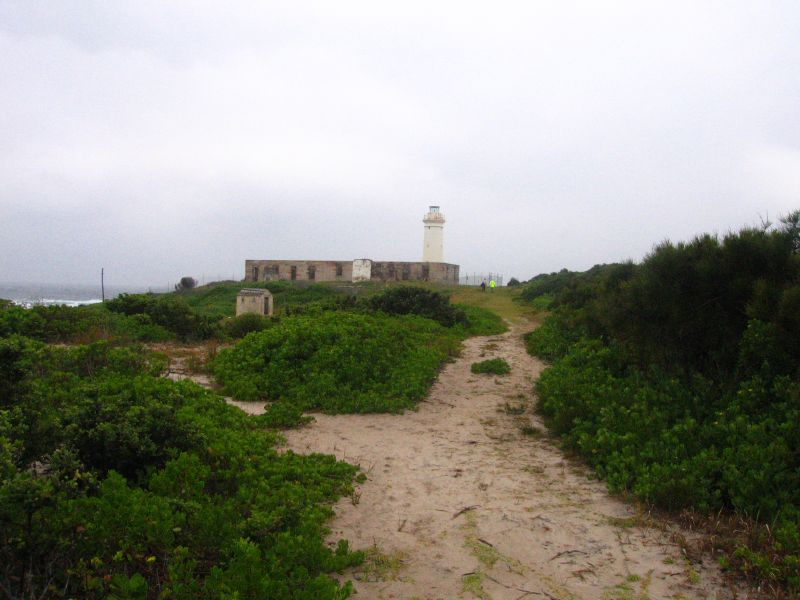
Approach to the Lighthouse showing the keepers' house and other structures.

A brick privy with a gabled roof clad in corrugated asbestos sheeting is located to the north of the cottage building. It was probably constructed circa 1930. Further north is the workshop building, which also housed the electricity generators at one point, dating from the 1950s. It features a flat and skillion roof, and concrete mounting blocks. Its most recent use was as a fishermen's cabin.

Other remains include a series of drystone walls near the lighthouse dating from 1865, and the footings and stay rings of the flagstaff, which has been removed, located south of the lighthouse adjacent to a stone retaining wall. Also at the site are two other timber-framed structures, one of which is a former fuel shed constructed circa 1970s, located south of the lighthouse. An above ground brick fuel bunker with a concrete roof and floor is located approximately 40 metres (130 ft) south of the lighthouse, on a rock outcrop.

At the north of the island are the remains of a 19th-century wharf including concrete tracks, rock cutting and iron fixings (several brackets and stumps). A concrete helipad west of the lighthouse was constructed in the 1970s.

== Site operation and visiting ==
The light is operated by Transport for NSW, while the site is managed by the NSW National Parks & Wildlife Service as part of the Tomaree National Park, in which it is located. Visiting the lighthouse is difficult. The point is connected to the mainland with a narrow tombolo, and is only accessible by foot at low tide. It is accessible by boat, and the grounds are open, though the tower is closed to the public.

== Heritage listing ==
On 2 April 1999, the lighthouse and adjacent structures were listed on the New South Wales State Heritage Register with the following statement of significance:

Point Stephens Lightstation and its setting are significant as one of a collection of lighthouses which combine the natural values of a coastal environment with the cultural values of a prominent landmark and isolated settlement. One of a small number of Victorian lighthouses designed by Colonial Architect Alexander Dawson, this example employs sandstone for the tower in a flared design incorporating an external stair to the first-floor entrance. The semi-detached terrace, now in a ruinous state, is among the most architecturally accomplished of the early detached residential housing type. The light station retains a rare remnant of the original Wilkins & Co lantern and has the potential for archaeological study at both the lightstation and wharf precincts.

— Statement of significance, New South Wales State Heritage Register.

== See also ==
- List of lighthouses in Australia

== Notes ==
- ^a : According to List of Lights. Lighthouses of Australia, New South Wales in The Lighthouse Directory lists 20s.
- ^b : According to Point Stephens Lighthouse Group (Place ID 1320) in the Australian Heritage Database, Lighthouses of Australia, New South Wales in The Lighthouse Directory, and Point Stephens and Sugarloaf Point Trip Report in the Lighthouses of Australia Inc Bulletin. The Point Stephens Lighthouse in the Lighthouses of New South Wales says 1989.
