= Nelson Head Light =

Lighthouse in New South Wales, Australia

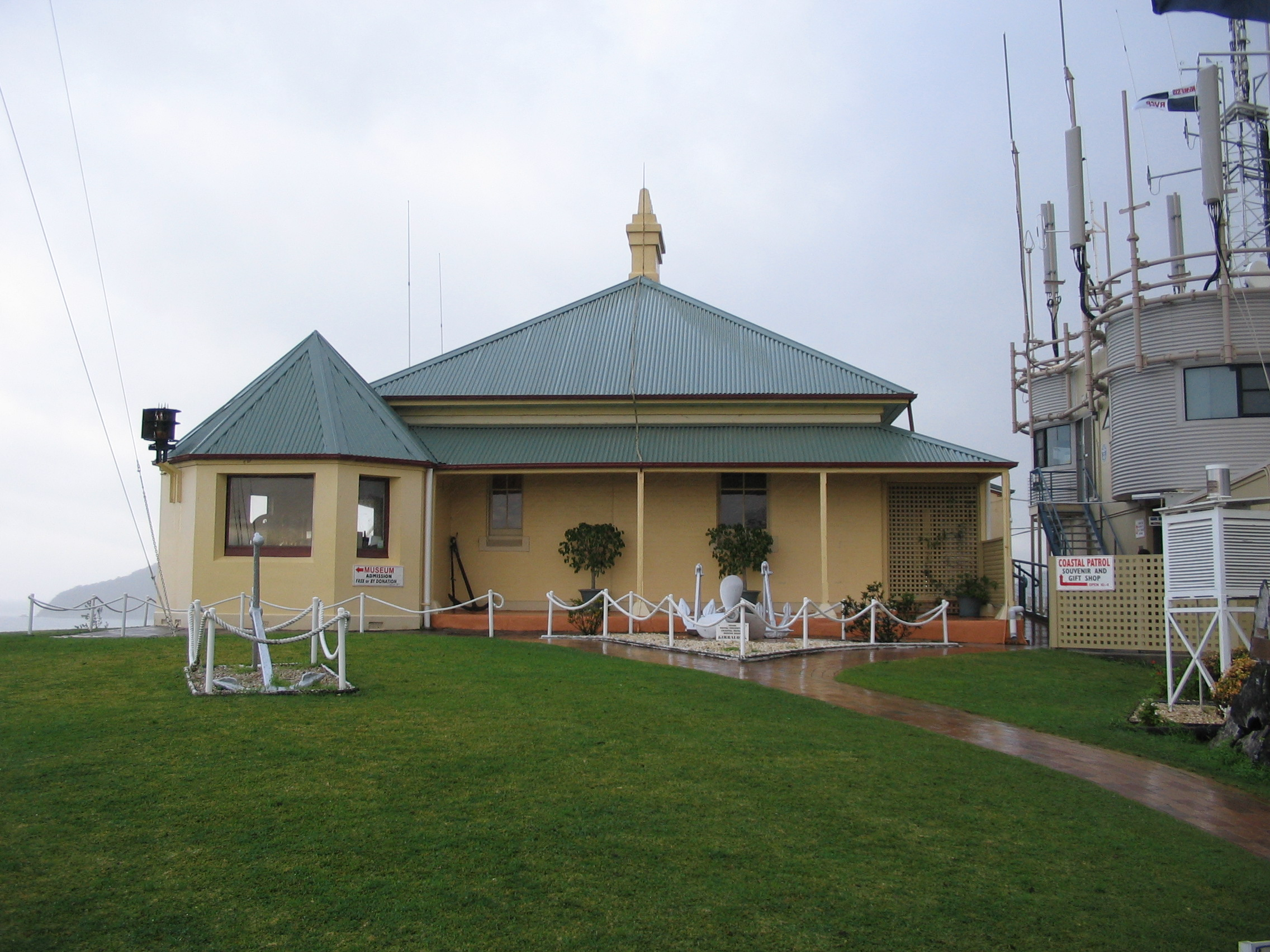
- Nelson Head Light, 2008
- Location: Nelson Head, Nelson Bay, New South Wales, Australia
- Coordinates: 32°42′37″S 152°09′41″E

Tower
- Constructed: 1872 (first)
- Automated: 1984
- Height: 10 ft (3.0 m)
- Shape: one-story building and no tower
- Markings: yellow (building)
- Operator: Marine Rescue NSW

Light
- First lit: 1876 (current)
- Deactivated: 2003
- Focal height: 128 ft (39 m)
- Characteristic: Oc WR

Nelson Head Light, also known as Nelson Head Inner Light, is an inactive, unusual lighthouse on Nelson Head, a headland northeast of the town of Nelson Bay, New South Wales, Australia, near Halifax Park, on the southern shore of Port Stephens. The light guided ships into the port. Unlike other lighthouses, the Nelson Head Light has no tower, but was shown through the window of the lantern room, and later mounted outside.

== History ==
The station was established in 1872 as four kerosene lamps shown from a wooden tower.

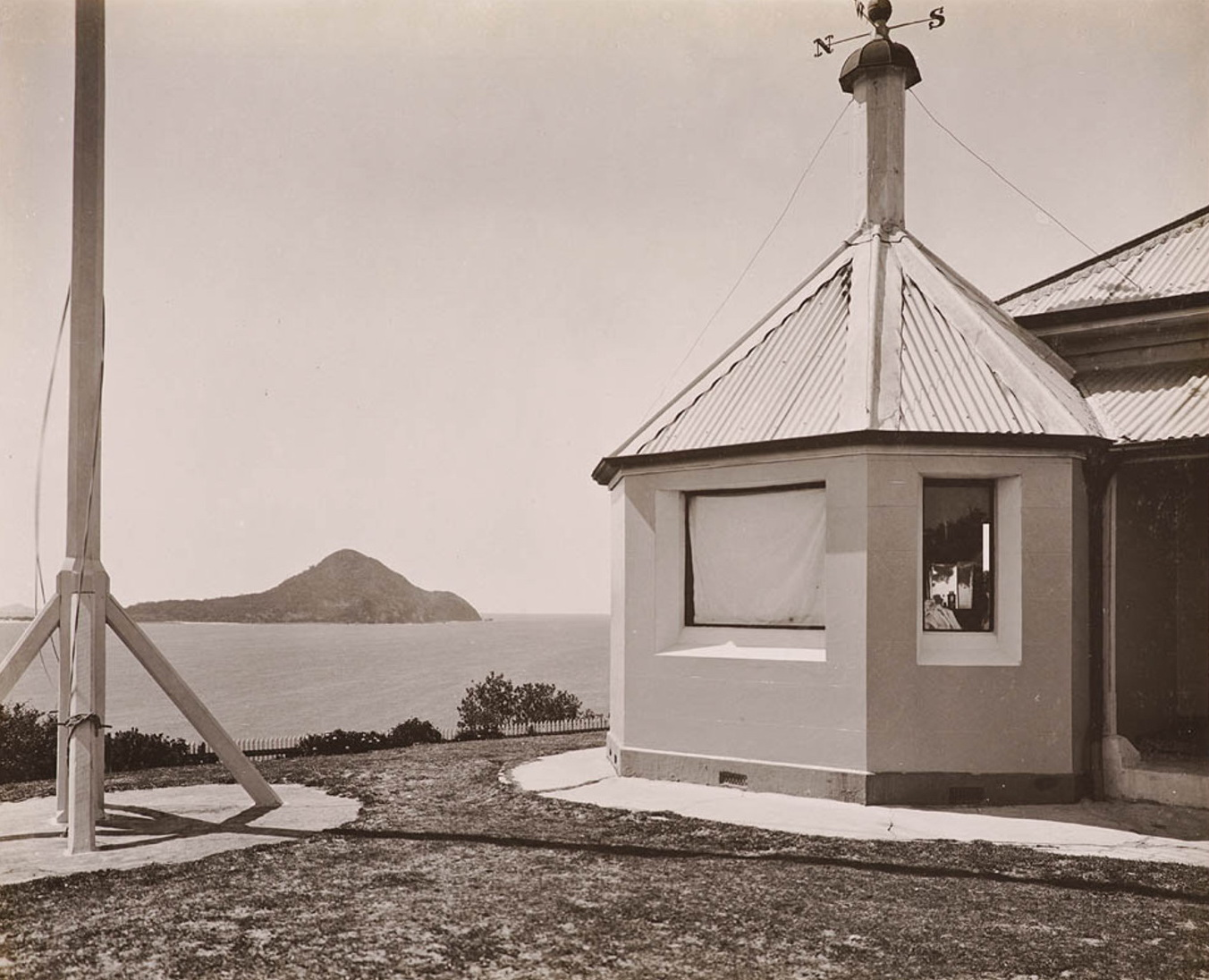
Nelson Head Light, 1902

The current cottage was built three years later, and the light was first shown from it in 1876. The light was installed in an octagonal lantern room attached to the house, and shown through a 3 metres (9.8 ft) window. The house was occupied by 14 successive resident keepers, and the Maritime Service Board, until 1985.

The light was electrified in 1946, and automated in 1984. Since 1986, the house has been preserved and maintained by the Nelson Head Lighthouse and Rescue Station Trust. In 1990, the Royal Volunteer Coastal Patrol was appointed as trustee. The house is now managed by Marine Rescue NSW, under the Royal Volunteer Coastal Patrol, and serves as a maritime museum.

In 1995 the light was replaced with a solar powered lantern which was attached outside the previous lantern room. In early 2003 the light was deemed unnecessary, and it was shut down.

== Visiting ==
The house is accessible by road from Nelson Bay and is open daily to visitors.

== See also ==
- List of lighthouses in Australia

== References and notes ==
- Rowlett, Russ. "Lighthouses of Australia: Northern New South Wales". The Lighthouse Directory. University of North Carolina at Chapel Hill.
- "Nelson Head Inner Lighthouse Nelson Bay Tourist Information". nelsonbaygetaway.com.au. Archived from the original on 24 February 2021.
- Searle, Garry. "Nelson Head". Lighthouses of New South Wales. SeaSide Lights.
- Plaque on the site, can be seen in "Grant and Tracey's Lighthouse Pages – Nelson Head". maizels.nu.
