= Tomaree National Park =

National park in Australia

- IUCN category II (national park)
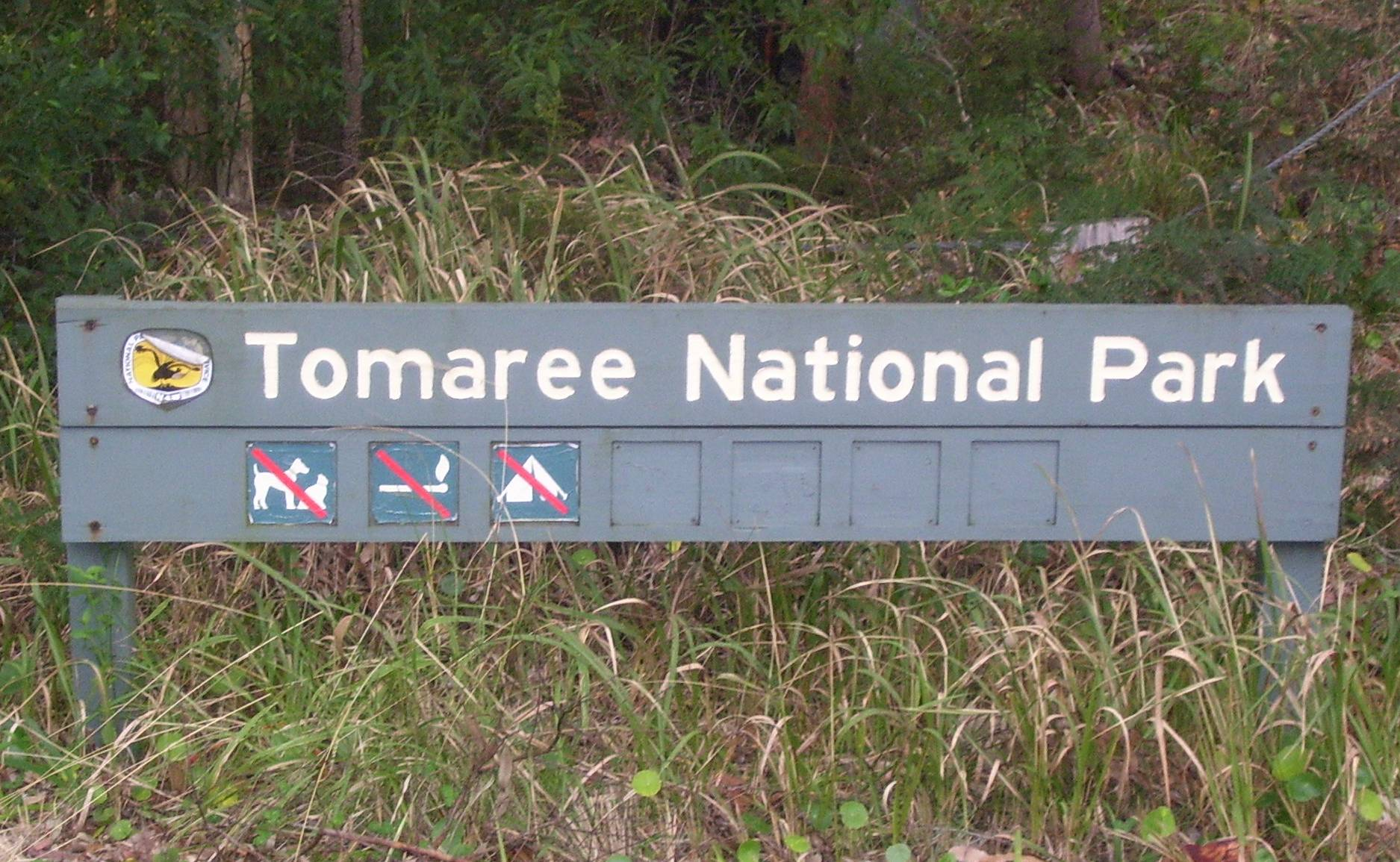
- Sign identifying the park

- Location within New South Wales
- Location: New South Wales
- Coordinates: 32°45′10″S 152°8′27″E
- Area: 23.18 km^{2} (8.95 sq mi)
- Established: 1984
- Governing body: NSW National Parks & Wildlife Service
- Website: Official website

Tomaree is a national park located in New South Wales, Australia, 145–155 km (90–96 mi) northeast of Sydney in the Port Stephens local government area. It is located on the shores of the Tasman Sea, extending north from Fishermans Bay to Shoal Bay passing through Boat Harbour, One Mile, Nelson Bay and Fingal Bay.

Most entry points to the park are indicated by signs installed by the NSW National Parks & Wildlife Service which usually indicate any activities that may be prohibited within park boundaries. One can for a walk on the beach or do whale watching, and one can also come across koalas dozing in the trees.

Two prominent locations in the park are Point Stephens Light, a lighthouse built in 1862 and the Tomaree Head Fortifications, World War II gun emplacements on Tomaree Head which were built in 1941, the location of the No. 20 Radar Station RAAF.

This is the traditional land of the Aboriginal people of Worimi, and provides important resources such as food, medicine and shelter.

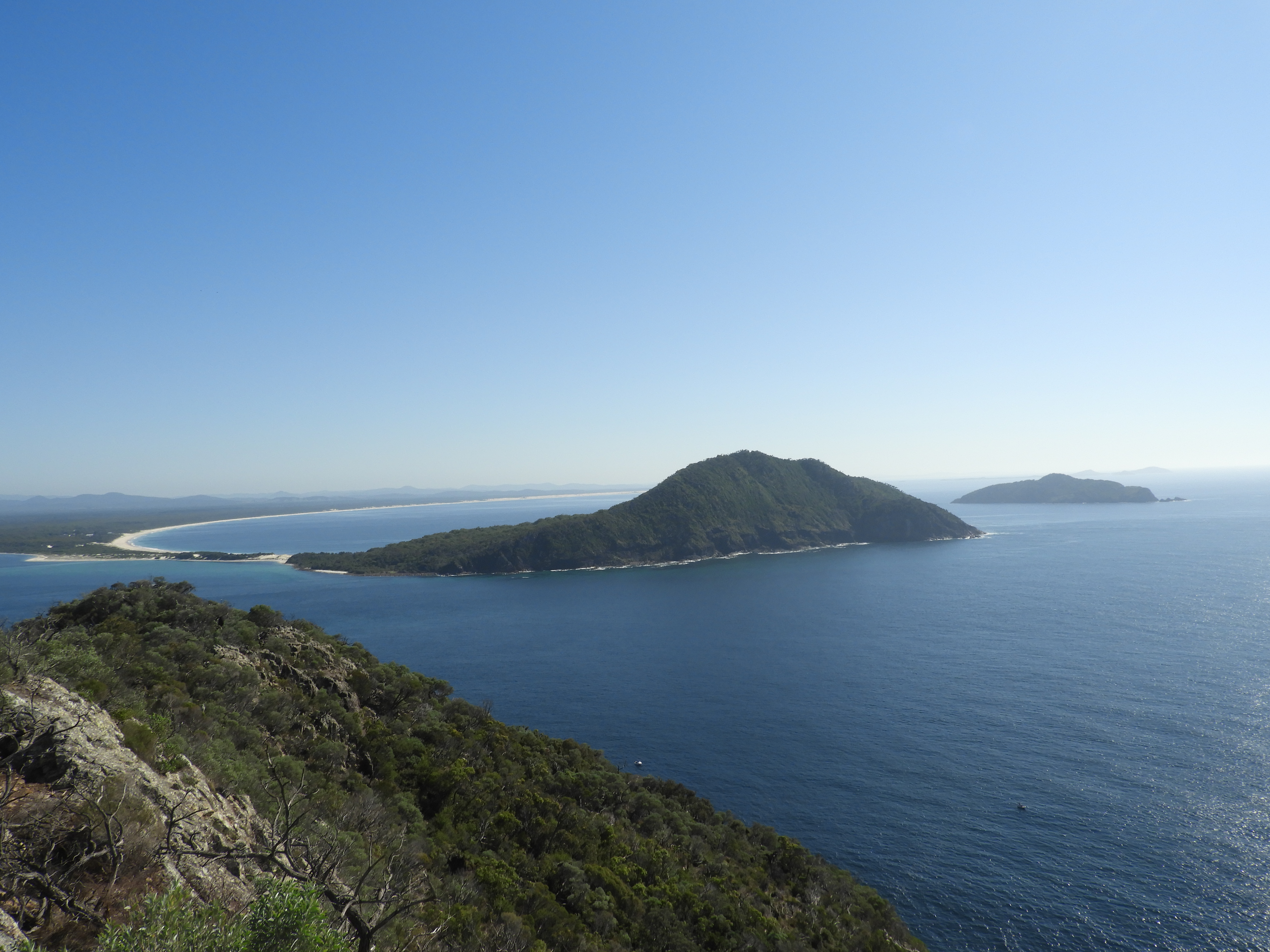
The view of Hawks Nest and beyond from the top of Tomaree Head Summit within Tomaree National Park

== See also ==
- Protected areas of New South Wales
