= Shoal Bay, New South Wales =

Shoal Bay
- Suburb
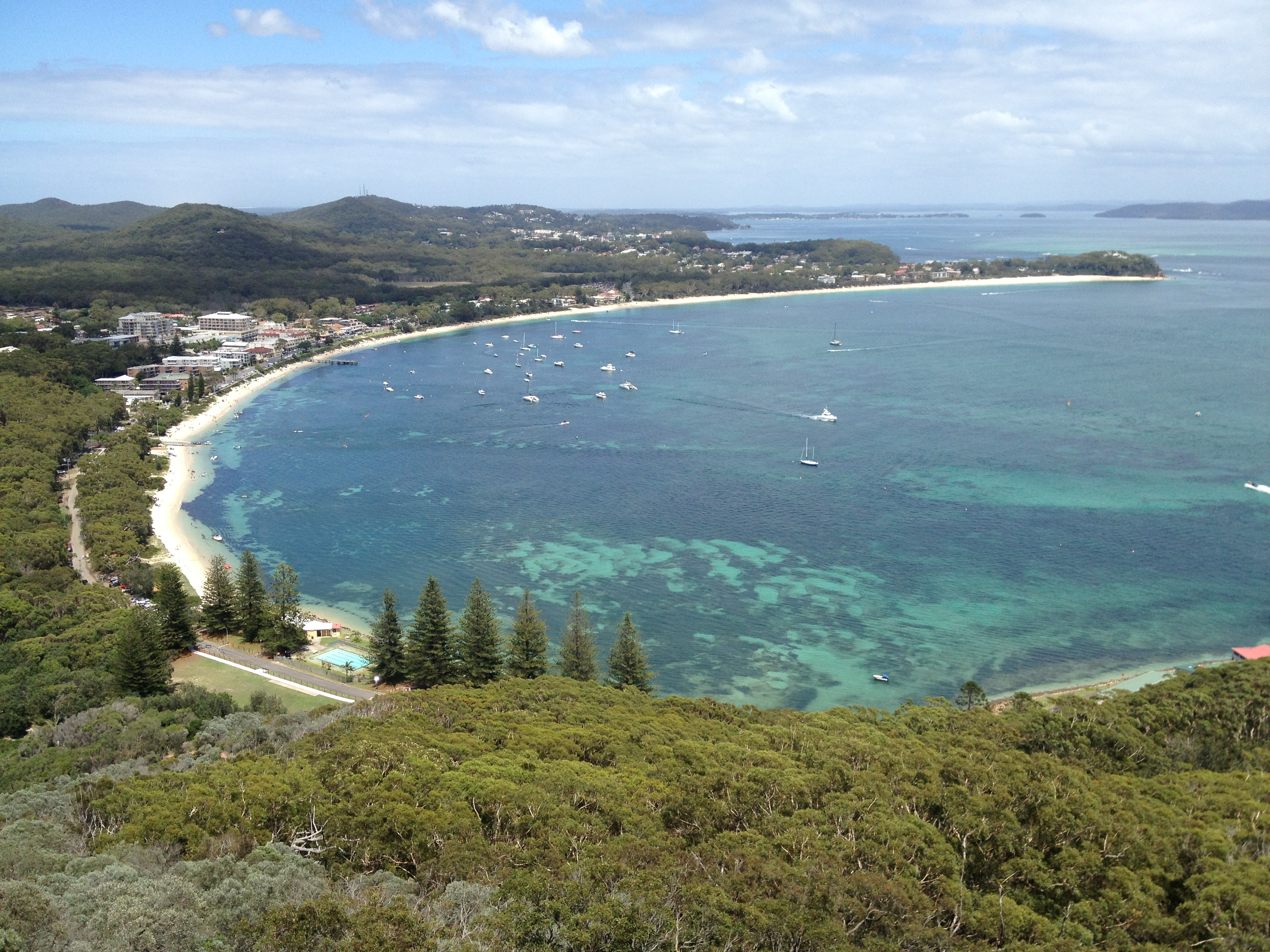
- Shoal Bay, NSW in 2012

- Interactive map of Shoal Bay
- Coordinates: 32°43′37″S 152°10′21″E
- Country: Australia
- State: New South Wales
- Region: Hunter
- LGA: Port Stephens Council
- Location: 210 km (130 mi) NNE of Sydney; 63 km (39 mi) NE of Newcastle; 48 km (30 mi) ENE of Raymond Terrace

Government
  - State electorate: Port Stephens
  - Federal division: Paterson

Area (Note: Area calculation is based on 1:100000 map 9332 PORT STEPHENS.)
  - Total: 4 km^{2} (1.5 sq mi)

Population
  - Total: 1,815 (2021 census)
  - Density: 453.75/km^{2} (1,175.2/sq mi) (Note: This is the average density of the whole suburb. The population density of the inhabited portion of the suburb, which is only approximately 1 square kilometre (0.4 sq mi), is 1,838/km^{2} (4,760/sq mi).)
- Time zone: UTC+10 (AEST)
  - Summer (DST): UTC+11 (AEDT)
- Postcode: 2315
- County: Gloucester
- Parish: Tomaree
- Mean max temp: 27.3 °C (81.1 °F)
- Mean min temp: 8.4 °C (47.1 °F)
- Annual rainfall: 1,348.9 mm (53.11 in)
Suburbs around Shoal Bay
Port Stephens	Port Stephens	Tasman Sea
Nelson Bay	Shoal Bay	Tasman Sea
Nelson Bay, Fingal Bay	Fingal Bay	Tasman Sea

Shoal Bay is the most eastern suburb of the Port Stephens local government area in the Hunter Region of New South Wales, Australia. It is located on the southern shore of Port Stephens, adjacent to the bay of the same name at the entrance to the port. It includes part of Tomaree National Park within its boundaries and, like other suburbs around Port Stephens, is a popular tourist destination, especially in summer months. At the 2021 census the town of Shoal Bay had a population of 1,815 but the population increases significantly during tourist season.

== Heritage listings ==
Shoal Bay has a number of heritage-listed sites, including:

- 2 Shoal Bay Road: Tomaree Head Fortifications
- Shoal Bay Road: Tomaree Holiday Lodge

== History ==
The Worimi people are the traditional owners of the Port Stephens area.

It was named by NSW Governor Lachlan Macquarie after he encountered the many sandy shoals when he first visited the area.
