= Nelson Bay, New South Wales =

Nelson Bay
- Suburb
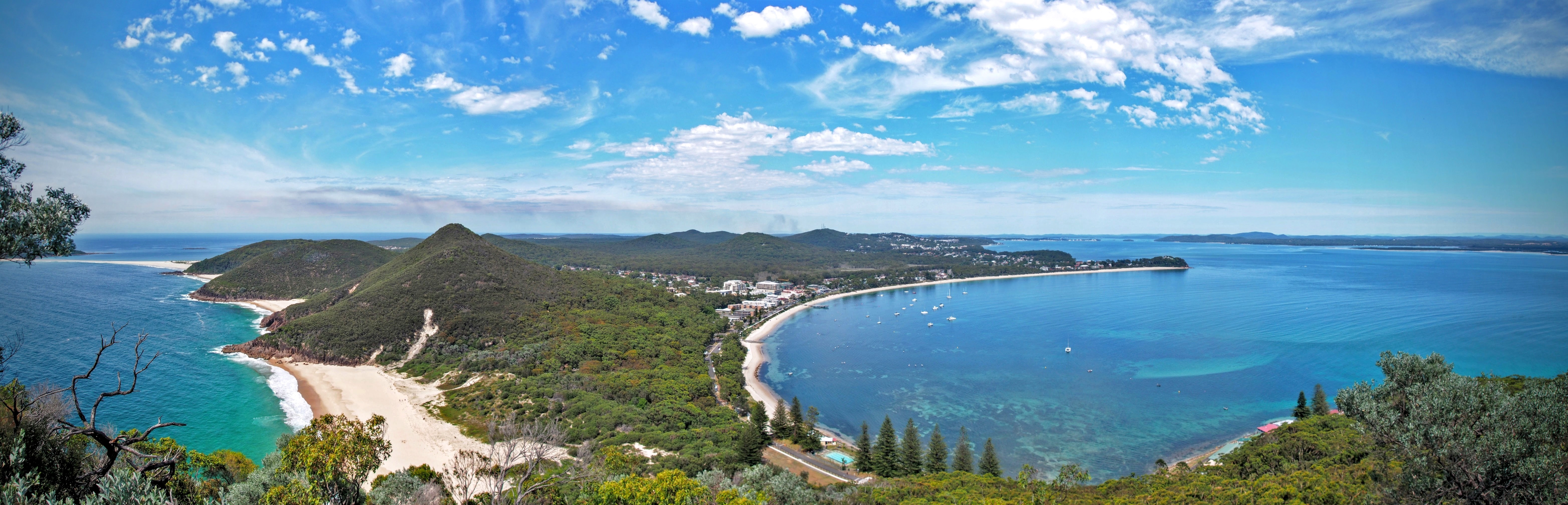
- Looking south from Tomaree Headland

- Interactive map of Nelson Bay
- Coordinates: 32°42′54″S 152°9′4″E
- Country: Australia
- State: New South Wales
- Region: Hunter
- LGA: Port Stephens Council
- Location: 207 km (129 mi) NNE of Sydney; 60 km (37 mi) NE of Newcastle; 45 km (28 mi) ENE of Raymond Terrace

Government
  - State electorate: Port Stephens
  - Federal division: Paterson

Area (Note: Area calculations are based on 1:100000 map 9232 NEWCASTLE.)
  - Total: 15.6 km^{2} (6.0 sq mi)

Population
  - Total: 6,141 (2021 census)
  - Density: 393.65/km^{2} (1,019.5/sq mi) (Note: The density figure provided is that for the whole of Nelson Bay. However, the population listed in the ABS data reside in only about 3.9 square kilometres (1.5 sq mi) (approximately 25%) of the suburb, the remainder being uninhabited for various reasons including that a large portion of the suburb is part of Tomaree National Park. The density in the inhabited area is approximately 1,383.6/km^{2} (3,584/sq mi).)
- Time zone: UTC+10 (AEST)
  - Summer (DST): UTC+11 (AEDT)
- Postcode: 2315
- County: Gloucester
- Parish: Tomaree
- Mean max temp: 27.3 °C (81.1 °F)
- Mean min temp: 8.4 °C (47.1 °F)
- Annual rainfall: 1,348.9 mm (53.11 in)
Suburbs around Nelson Bay
Port Stephens	Port Stephens	Port Stephens
Corlette, Salamander Bay	Nelson Bay	Shoal Bay, Fingal Bay
Anna Bay, One Mile	One Mile, Fingal Bay	Fingal Bay

Nelson Bay is a significant township of the Port Stephens local government area in the Hunter Region of New South Wales, Australia. It is located on a bay of the same name on the southern shore of Port Stephens about 60 kilometres (37 mi) by road north-east of Newcastle, its nearest rail link. At the 2021 census, the suburb of Nelson Bay had a population of 6,141.

It is a major tourism centre, particularly for dolphin and whale watching, surfing, diving, fishing and other recreational aquatic activities. The eastern boundaries of Nelson Bay lie within the Tomaree National Park while the southeastern section is almost entirely within the park. Nelson Head Light, an unusual lighthouse built in 1875, is positioned on the northeast corner.

== Early settlers ==
Early settlers included the Dalton family, the patriarch being Captain John Dalton who sailed his ship SS Kingsley to Sydney with fresh marine produce from Port Stephens. He built a house "Westward Ho" in 1882 on the hill overlooking the modern town, on 16 ha (40 acres). He donated land from his holding for the Methodist Church, and for a school.

== Demographics ==
At the 2021 census, there were 28,418 people in the urban area of Nelson Bay.

- Aboriginal and Torres Strait Islander people made up 3.7% of the population.
- 78.3% of people were born in Australia. The most common other countries of birth were England 5.7%, New Zealand 1.6%, Scotland 0.7%, South Africa 0.7% and Germany 0.6%.
- 89.6% of people only spoke English at home. Other languages spoken at home included Italian and Greek, both at 0.4%.
- The most common responses for religion were No Religion 37.3%, Catholic 20.4% and Anglican 20.0%.

Historical population
Year	Pop.	±%
1961	1,787	—
1966	2,727	+52.6%
1971	4,185	+53.5%
1976	5,376	+28.5%
1981	7,931	+47.5%
1986	9,376	+18.2%
1991	6,766	−27.8%
1996	7,001	+3.5%
2001	7,968	+13.8%
2006	8,152	+2.3%
2011	11,060	+35.7%
2016	13,966	+26.3%
2021	14,593	+4.5%
Source: Australian Bureau of Statistics data.

== Transport ==
Port Stephens Coaches operate local services to Newcastle, Raymond Terrace and Soldiers Point as well as an express service to Sydney.

== Climate ==
Nelson Bay has a maritime-influenced humid subtropical climate (Cfa) with warm humid summers, damp autumns, cool wet winters and relatively dry springs. The suburb is relatively sunny, receiving 117.8 clear days annually. Despite the high amount of rainfall throughout the year (due to its exposed location on a peninsula), the rain days are relatively few, barely reaching over 10 days per month.

Climate data for Nelson Head (1881–2023)
Month	Jan	Feb	Mar	Apr	May	Jun	Jul	Aug	Sep	Oct	Nov	Dec	Year
Record high °C (°F)	38.5 (101.3)	41.5 (106.7)	36.3 (97.3)	32.4 (90.3)	26.7 (80.1)	24.6 (76.3)	24.7 (76.5)	28.5 (83.3)	34.2 (93.6)	34.5 (94.1)	40.6 (105.1)	39.3 (102.7)	41.5 (106.7)
Mean daily maximum °C (°F)	27.3 (81.1)	27.0 (80.6)	25.9 (78.6)	23.5 (74.3)	20.8 (69.4)	18.3 (64.9)	17.5 (63.5)	18.9 (66.0)	21.4 (70.5)	23.2 (73.8)	24.7 (76.5)	26.1 (79.0)	22.9 (73.2)
Mean daily minimum °C (°F)	18.9 (66.0)	19.1 (66.4)	17.8 (64.0)	15.2 (59.4)	12.4 (54.3)	10.2 (50.4)	9.0 (48.2)	9.8 (49.6)	12.0 (53.6)	14.1 (57.4)	16.0 (60.8)	17.7 (63.9)	14.4 (57.9)
Record low °C (°F)	11.0 (51.8)	14.5 (58.1)	11.5 (52.7)	9.0 (48.2)	5.9 (42.6)	4.4 (39.9)	2.2 (36.0)	1.1 (34.0)	5.0 (41.0)	6.1 (43.0)	6.7 (44.1)	9.0 (48.2)	1.1 (34.0)
Average precipitation mm (inches)	100.5 (3.96)	111.3 (4.38)	117.5 (4.63)	129.3 (5.09)	150.7 (5.93)	155.9 (6.14)	138.5 (5.45)	102.4 (4.03)	89.2 (3.51)	77.9 (3.07)	80.2 (3.16)	93.2 (3.67)	1,343.2 (52.88)
Average precipitation days	10.5	10.3	11.3	11.9	12.7	12.3	11.7	10.6	10.0	10.2	10.2	10.4	132.1
